

400001–400100 

|-bgcolor=#fefefe
| 400001 ||  || — || March 23, 2006 || Kitt Peak || Spacewatch || — || align=right data-sort-value="0.80" | 800 m || 
|-id=002 bgcolor=#fefefe
| 400002 ||  || — || April 2, 2006 || Kitt Peak || Spacewatch || NYS || align=right data-sort-value="0.74" | 740 m || 
|-id=003 bgcolor=#fefefe
| 400003 ||  || — || April 19, 2006 || Kitt Peak || Spacewatch || V || align=right data-sort-value="0.77" | 770 m || 
|-id=004 bgcolor=#fefefe
| 400004 ||  || — || April 19, 2006 || Mount Lemmon || Mount Lemmon Survey || — || align=right data-sort-value="0.74" | 740 m || 
|-id=005 bgcolor=#fefefe
| 400005 ||  || — || April 25, 2006 || Kitt Peak || Spacewatch || — || align=right data-sort-value="0.74" | 740 m || 
|-id=006 bgcolor=#fefefe
| 400006 ||  || — || April 29, 2006 || Kitt Peak || Spacewatch || MAS || align=right data-sort-value="0.72" | 720 m || 
|-id=007 bgcolor=#fefefe
| 400007 ||  || — || April 29, 2006 || Kitt Peak || Spacewatch || V || align=right data-sort-value="0.79" | 790 m || 
|-id=008 bgcolor=#E9E9E9
| 400008 ||  || — || April 30, 2006 || Kitt Peak || Spacewatch || — || align=right | 2.0 km || 
|-id=009 bgcolor=#fefefe
| 400009 ||  || — || May 3, 2006 || Kitt Peak || Spacewatch || — || align=right data-sort-value="0.89" | 890 m || 
|-id=010 bgcolor=#fefefe
| 400010 ||  || — || May 3, 2006 || Kitt Peak || Spacewatch || — || align=right data-sort-value="0.86" | 860 m || 
|-id=011 bgcolor=#fefefe
| 400011 ||  || — || May 6, 2006 || Mount Lemmon || Mount Lemmon Survey || NYS || align=right data-sort-value="0.79" | 790 m || 
|-id=012 bgcolor=#fefefe
| 400012 ||  || — || May 19, 2006 || Mount Lemmon || Mount Lemmon Survey || H || align=right data-sort-value="0.83" | 830 m || 
|-id=013 bgcolor=#d6d6d6
| 400013 ||  || — || May 19, 2006 || Mount Lemmon || Mount Lemmon Survey || SHU3:2 || align=right | 5.8 km || 
|-id=014 bgcolor=#fefefe
| 400014 ||  || — || April 19, 2006 || Mount Lemmon || Mount Lemmon Survey || — || align=right data-sort-value="0.96" | 960 m || 
|-id=015 bgcolor=#fefefe
| 400015 ||  || — || May 25, 2006 || Mauna Kea || P. A. Wiegert || — || align=right data-sort-value="0.71" | 710 m || 
|-id=016 bgcolor=#E9E9E9
| 400016 ||  || — || June 25, 2006 || Eskridge || Farpoint Obs. || — || align=right | 1.4 km || 
|-id=017 bgcolor=#E9E9E9
| 400017 ||  || — || July 26, 2006 || Hibiscus || S. F. Hönig || (5) || align=right data-sort-value="0.73" | 730 m || 
|-id=018 bgcolor=#E9E9E9
| 400018 ||  || — || July 27, 2006 || Hibiscus || S. F. Hönig || — || align=right | 1.1 km || 
|-id=019 bgcolor=#E9E9E9
| 400019 ||  || — || July 25, 2006 || Palomar || NEAT || — || align=right data-sort-value="0.92" | 920 m || 
|-id=020 bgcolor=#E9E9E9
| 400020 ||  || — || July 21, 2006 || Mount Lemmon || Mount Lemmon Survey || — || align=right | 1.9 km || 
|-id=021 bgcolor=#d6d6d6
| 400021 ||  || — || August 13, 2006 || Palomar || NEAT || SHU3:2 || align=right | 5.6 km || 
|-id=022 bgcolor=#E9E9E9
| 400022 ||  || — || August 15, 2006 || Palomar || NEAT || — || align=right | 1.9 km || 
|-id=023 bgcolor=#E9E9E9
| 400023 ||  || — || August 13, 2006 || Siding Spring || SSS || — || align=right | 2.7 km || 
|-id=024 bgcolor=#E9E9E9
| 400024 ||  || — || August 13, 2006 || Palomar || NEAT || JUN || align=right | 1.2 km || 
|-id=025 bgcolor=#d6d6d6
| 400025 ||  || — || August 17, 2006 || Palomar || NEAT || SHU3:2 || align=right | 7.0 km || 
|-id=026 bgcolor=#E9E9E9
| 400026 ||  || — || August 17, 2006 || Palomar || NEAT || — || align=right | 1.0 km || 
|-id=027 bgcolor=#E9E9E9
| 400027 ||  || — || August 21, 2006 || Kitt Peak || Spacewatch || — || align=right | 1.0 km || 
|-id=028 bgcolor=#E9E9E9
| 400028 ||  || — || August 27, 2006 || Kitt Peak || Spacewatch || (5)critical || align=right data-sort-value="0.61" | 610 m || 
|-id=029 bgcolor=#E9E9E9
| 400029 ||  || — || August 16, 2006 || Palomar || NEAT || — || align=right | 1.7 km || 
|-id=030 bgcolor=#E9E9E9
| 400030 ||  || — || August 16, 2006 || Palomar || NEAT || (194) || align=right | 1.1 km || 
|-id=031 bgcolor=#E9E9E9
| 400031 ||  || — || August 28, 2006 || Catalina || CSS || (5) || align=right data-sort-value="0.75" | 750 m || 
|-id=032 bgcolor=#E9E9E9
| 400032 ||  || — || August 28, 2006 || Catalina || CSS || EUN || align=right | 1.2 km || 
|-id=033 bgcolor=#E9E9E9
| 400033 ||  || — || August 28, 2006 || Goodricke-Pigott || R. A. Tucker || — || align=right | 2.0 km || 
|-id=034 bgcolor=#E9E9E9
| 400034 ||  || — || August 27, 2006 || Anderson Mesa || LONEOS || (5) || align=right data-sort-value="0.92" | 920 m || 
|-id=035 bgcolor=#E9E9E9
| 400035 ||  || — || August 28, 2006 || Socorro || LINEAR || — || align=right | 3.0 km || 
|-id=036 bgcolor=#E9E9E9
| 400036 ||  || — || August 29, 2006 || Catalina || CSS || — || align=right | 1.7 km || 
|-id=037 bgcolor=#E9E9E9
| 400037 ||  || — || August 27, 2006 || Anderson Mesa || LONEOS || (5) || align=right data-sort-value="0.81" | 810 m || 
|-id=038 bgcolor=#E9E9E9
| 400038 ||  || — || August 18, 2006 || Kitt Peak || Spacewatch || — || align=right | 2.6 km || 
|-id=039 bgcolor=#E9E9E9
| 400039 ||  || — || August 29, 2006 || Anderson Mesa || LONEOS || critical || align=right data-sort-value="0.82" | 820 m || 
|-id=040 bgcolor=#E9E9E9
| 400040 ||  || — || August 30, 2006 || Anderson Mesa || LONEOS || — || align=right data-sort-value="0.86" | 860 m || 
|-id=041 bgcolor=#E9E9E9
| 400041 ||  || — || August 18, 2006 || Kitt Peak || Spacewatch || — || align=right data-sort-value="0.98" | 980 m || 
|-id=042 bgcolor=#E9E9E9
| 400042 ||  || — || September 15, 2006 || Kitt Peak || Spacewatch || — || align=right | 1.0 km || 
|-id=043 bgcolor=#E9E9E9
| 400043 ||  || — || September 15, 2006 || Kitt Peak || Spacewatch || — || align=right | 1.0 km || 
|-id=044 bgcolor=#E9E9E9
| 400044 ||  || — || September 15, 2006 || Kitt Peak || Spacewatch || — || align=right | 1.3 km || 
|-id=045 bgcolor=#E9E9E9
| 400045 ||  || — || September 15, 2006 || Kitt Peak || Spacewatch || — || align=right | 1.4 km || 
|-id=046 bgcolor=#E9E9E9
| 400046 ||  || — || September 14, 2006 || Catalina || CSS || — || align=right | 1.2 km || 
|-id=047 bgcolor=#E9E9E9
| 400047 ||  || — || September 14, 2006 || Catalina || CSS || EUN || align=right | 1.1 km || 
|-id=048 bgcolor=#E9E9E9
| 400048 ||  || — || September 14, 2006 || Mauna Kea || J. Masiero || — || align=right | 1.5 km || 
|-id=049 bgcolor=#E9E9E9
| 400049 ||  || — || September 12, 2006 || Mayhill || A. Lowe || — || align=right | 1.3 km || 
|-id=050 bgcolor=#E9E9E9
| 400050 ||  || — || September 16, 2006 || Anderson Mesa || LONEOS || — || align=right | 1.2 km || 
|-id=051 bgcolor=#E9E9E9
| 400051 ||  || — || September 18, 2006 || Kitt Peak || Spacewatch || critical || align=right data-sort-value="0.75" | 750 m || 
|-id=052 bgcolor=#E9E9E9
| 400052 ||  || — || September 18, 2006 || Anderson Mesa || LONEOS || — || align=right | 2.5 km || 
|-id=053 bgcolor=#E9E9E9
| 400053 ||  || — || September 16, 2006 || Catalina || CSS || — || align=right | 1.5 km || 
|-id=054 bgcolor=#E9E9E9
| 400054 ||  || — || September 18, 2006 || Catalina || CSS || — || align=right | 1.0 km || 
|-id=055 bgcolor=#E9E9E9
| 400055 ||  || — || September 16, 2006 || Catalina || CSS || ADE || align=right | 1.7 km || 
|-id=056 bgcolor=#E9E9E9
| 400056 ||  || — || September 18, 2006 || Catalina || CSS || (5) || align=right data-sort-value="0.76" | 760 m || 
|-id=057 bgcolor=#E9E9E9
| 400057 ||  || — || July 21, 2006 || Mount Lemmon || Mount Lemmon Survey || — || align=right | 1.9 km || 
|-id=058 bgcolor=#E9E9E9
| 400058 ||  || — || September 19, 2006 || Kitt Peak || Spacewatch || critical || align=right | 1.4 km || 
|-id=059 bgcolor=#E9E9E9
| 400059 ||  || — || September 18, 2006 || Kitt Peak || Spacewatch || — || align=right | 2.2 km || 
|-id=060 bgcolor=#E9E9E9
| 400060 ||  || — || September 18, 2006 || Kitt Peak || Spacewatch || — || align=right data-sort-value="0.89" | 890 m || 
|-id=061 bgcolor=#E9E9E9
| 400061 ||  || — || September 18, 2006 || Kitt Peak || Spacewatch || — || align=right | 2.2 km || 
|-id=062 bgcolor=#E9E9E9
| 400062 ||  || — || September 18, 2006 || Kitt Peak || Spacewatch || — || align=right | 1.4 km || 
|-id=063 bgcolor=#E9E9E9
| 400063 ||  || — || September 18, 2006 || Kitt Peak || Spacewatch || HOF || align=right | 2.2 km || 
|-id=064 bgcolor=#E9E9E9
| 400064 ||  || — || September 19, 2006 || Catalina || CSS || — || align=right | 2.8 km || 
|-id=065 bgcolor=#E9E9E9
| 400065 ||  || — || September 24, 2006 || Kitt Peak || Spacewatch || — || align=right | 1.3 km || 
|-id=066 bgcolor=#E9E9E9
| 400066 ||  || — || September 24, 2006 || Anderson Mesa || LONEOS || — || align=right | 3.3 km || 
|-id=067 bgcolor=#E9E9E9
| 400067 ||  || — || September 17, 2006 || Catalina || CSS || MAR || align=right | 1.4 km || 
|-id=068 bgcolor=#E9E9E9
| 400068 ||  || — || September 23, 2006 || Kitami || K. Endate || (5) || align=right data-sort-value="0.85" | 850 m || 
|-id=069 bgcolor=#E9E9E9
| 400069 ||  || — || September 19, 2006 || Kitt Peak || Spacewatch || — || align=right | 1.5 km || 
|-id=070 bgcolor=#E9E9E9
| 400070 ||  || — || September 23, 2006 || Kitt Peak || Spacewatch || — || align=right | 1.3 km || 
|-id=071 bgcolor=#E9E9E9
| 400071 ||  || — || September 25, 2006 || Kitt Peak || Spacewatch || — || align=right | 2.7 km || 
|-id=072 bgcolor=#E9E9E9
| 400072 ||  || — || September 25, 2006 || Moletai || Molėtai Obs. || — || align=right | 1.0 km || 
|-id=073 bgcolor=#E9E9E9
| 400073 ||  || — || September 19, 2006 || Kitt Peak || Spacewatch || — || align=right | 1.2 km || 
|-id=074 bgcolor=#E9E9E9
| 400074 ||  || — || September 26, 2006 || Socorro || LINEAR || — || align=right | 2.6 km || 
|-id=075 bgcolor=#E9E9E9
| 400075 ||  || — || September 18, 2006 || Kitt Peak || Spacewatch || — || align=right | 2.0 km || 
|-id=076 bgcolor=#E9E9E9
| 400076 ||  || — || September 26, 2006 || Kitt Peak || Spacewatch || — || align=right | 1.9 km || 
|-id=077 bgcolor=#E9E9E9
| 400077 ||  || — || August 28, 2006 || Kitt Peak || Spacewatch || — || align=right | 1.2 km || 
|-id=078 bgcolor=#E9E9E9
| 400078 ||  || — || September 26, 2006 || Kitt Peak || Spacewatch || — || align=right | 3.1 km || 
|-id=079 bgcolor=#E9E9E9
| 400079 ||  || — || September 25, 2006 || Catalina || CSS || HNS || align=right | 1.6 km || 
|-id=080 bgcolor=#E9E9E9
| 400080 ||  || — || September 27, 2006 || Catalina || CSS || — || align=right | 3.3 km || 
|-id=081 bgcolor=#E9E9E9
| 400081 ||  || — || September 26, 2006 || Catalina || CSS || — || align=right | 1.1 km || 
|-id=082 bgcolor=#E9E9E9
| 400082 ||  || — || September 27, 2006 || Kitt Peak || Spacewatch || — || align=right | 1.3 km || 
|-id=083 bgcolor=#E9E9E9
| 400083 ||  || — || September 28, 2006 || Kitt Peak || Spacewatch || — || align=right | 1.6 km || 
|-id=084 bgcolor=#E9E9E9
| 400084 ||  || — || September 28, 2006 || Kitt Peak || Spacewatch || — || align=right | 2.1 km || 
|-id=085 bgcolor=#E9E9E9
| 400085 ||  || — || September 28, 2006 || Kitt Peak || Spacewatch || (5) || align=right data-sort-value="0.93" | 930 m || 
|-id=086 bgcolor=#E9E9E9
| 400086 ||  || — || September 30, 2006 || Catalina || CSS || — || align=right | 1.6 km || 
|-id=087 bgcolor=#E9E9E9
| 400087 ||  || — || September 30, 2006 || Catalina || CSS || — || align=right | 1.0 km || 
|-id=088 bgcolor=#fefefe
| 400088 ||  || — || September 28, 2006 || Farra d'Isonzo || Farra d'Isonzo || H || align=right data-sort-value="0.63" | 630 m || 
|-id=089 bgcolor=#d6d6d6
| 400089 ||  || — || September 29, 2006 || Apache Point || A. C. Becker || — || align=right | 3.2 km || 
|-id=090 bgcolor=#E9E9E9
| 400090 ||  || — || September 30, 2006 || Apache Point || A. C. Becker || — || align=right | 2.3 km || 
|-id=091 bgcolor=#E9E9E9
| 400091 ||  || — || September 30, 2006 || Apache Point || A. C. Becker || — || align=right | 2.0 km || 
|-id=092 bgcolor=#E9E9E9
| 400092 ||  || — || September 25, 2006 || Kitt Peak || Spacewatch || HOF || align=right | 2.3 km || 
|-id=093 bgcolor=#E9E9E9
| 400093 ||  || — || September 19, 2006 || Kitt Peak || Spacewatch || — || align=right | 1.9 km || 
|-id=094 bgcolor=#E9E9E9
| 400094 ||  || — || September 26, 2006 || Mount Lemmon || Mount Lemmon Survey || — || align=right | 1.2 km || 
|-id=095 bgcolor=#E9E9E9
| 400095 ||  || — || September 25, 2006 || Catalina || CSS || — || align=right | 2.4 km || 
|-id=096 bgcolor=#E9E9E9
| 400096 ||  || — || October 10, 2006 || Palomar || NEAT || EUN || align=right | 1.5 km || 
|-id=097 bgcolor=#E9E9E9
| 400097 ||  || — || October 10, 2006 || Palomar || NEAT || critical || align=right | 1.5 km || 
|-id=098 bgcolor=#E9E9E9
| 400098 ||  || — || October 10, 2006 || Palomar || NEAT || (5) || align=right data-sort-value="0.84" | 840 m || 
|-id=099 bgcolor=#E9E9E9
| 400099 ||  || — || October 12, 2006 || Kitt Peak || Spacewatch || — || align=right data-sort-value="0.94" | 940 m || 
|-id=100 bgcolor=#E9E9E9
| 400100 ||  || — || October 12, 2006 || Kitt Peak || Spacewatch || — || align=right | 1.6 km || 
|}

400101–400200 

|-bgcolor=#E9E9E9
| 400101 ||  || — || October 12, 2006 || Kitt Peak || Spacewatch || — || align=right | 1.4 km || 
|-id=102 bgcolor=#E9E9E9
| 400102 ||  || — || October 12, 2006 || Kitt Peak || Spacewatch || — || align=right | 1.4 km || 
|-id=103 bgcolor=#FA8072
| 400103 ||  || — || June 3, 2006 || Catalina || CSS || — || align=right | 1.8 km || 
|-id=104 bgcolor=#E9E9E9
| 400104 ||  || — || October 11, 2006 || Palomar || NEAT || — || align=right | 1.5 km || 
|-id=105 bgcolor=#E9E9E9
| 400105 ||  || — || October 11, 2006 || Palomar || NEAT || — || align=right | 1.5 km || 
|-id=106 bgcolor=#E9E9E9
| 400106 ||  || — || October 13, 2006 || Kitt Peak || Spacewatch || — || align=right | 1.8 km || 
|-id=107 bgcolor=#E9E9E9
| 400107 ||  || — || October 13, 2006 || Kitt Peak || Spacewatch || — || align=right | 1.0 km || 
|-id=108 bgcolor=#E9E9E9
| 400108 ||  || — || October 11, 2006 || Palomar || NEAT || ADE || align=right | 2.0 km || 
|-id=109 bgcolor=#E9E9E9
| 400109 ||  || — || October 2, 2006 || Mount Lemmon || Mount Lemmon Survey || — || align=right | 1.4 km || 
|-id=110 bgcolor=#E9E9E9
| 400110 ||  || — || October 4, 2006 || Mount Lemmon || Mount Lemmon Survey || (5) || align=right data-sort-value="0.98" | 980 m || 
|-id=111 bgcolor=#E9E9E9
| 400111 ||  || — || October 3, 2006 || Mount Lemmon || Mount Lemmon Survey || (5) || align=right data-sort-value="0.85" | 850 m || 
|-id=112 bgcolor=#E9E9E9
| 400112 ||  || — || October 16, 2006 || Catalina || CSS || — || align=right | 1.7 km || 
|-id=113 bgcolor=#E9E9E9
| 400113 ||  || — || October 17, 2006 || Mount Lemmon || Mount Lemmon Survey || — || align=right | 2.5 km || 
|-id=114 bgcolor=#E9E9E9
| 400114 ||  || — || October 16, 2006 || Kitt Peak || Spacewatch || — || align=right | 1.2 km || 
|-id=115 bgcolor=#E9E9E9
| 400115 ||  || — || October 16, 2006 || Kitt Peak || Spacewatch || — || align=right data-sort-value="0.88" | 880 m || 
|-id=116 bgcolor=#E9E9E9
| 400116 ||  || — || October 16, 2006 || Kitt Peak || Spacewatch || — || align=right | 1.4 km || 
|-id=117 bgcolor=#E9E9E9
| 400117 ||  || — || September 25, 2006 || Kitt Peak || Spacewatch || — || align=right | 1.9 km || 
|-id=118 bgcolor=#E9E9E9
| 400118 ||  || — || October 16, 2006 || Kitt Peak || Spacewatch || — || align=right | 1.3 km || 
|-id=119 bgcolor=#E9E9E9
| 400119 ||  || — || October 16, 2006 || Kitt Peak || Spacewatch || (5) || align=right data-sort-value="0.89" | 890 m || 
|-id=120 bgcolor=#E9E9E9
| 400120 ||  || — || October 17, 2006 || Kitt Peak || Spacewatch || — || align=right | 1.8 km || 
|-id=121 bgcolor=#E9E9E9
| 400121 ||  || — || October 18, 2006 || Kitt Peak || Spacewatch || ADE || align=right | 2.1 km || 
|-id=122 bgcolor=#E9E9E9
| 400122 ||  || — || October 17, 2006 || Mount Lemmon || Mount Lemmon Survey || — || align=right | 1.5 km || 
|-id=123 bgcolor=#E9E9E9
| 400123 ||  || — || October 17, 2006 || Kitt Peak || Spacewatch || — || align=right | 1.4 km || 
|-id=124 bgcolor=#E9E9E9
| 400124 ||  || — || October 17, 2006 || Kitt Peak || Spacewatch || — || align=right | 1.9 km || 
|-id=125 bgcolor=#E9E9E9
| 400125 ||  || — || October 3, 2006 || Mount Lemmon || Mount Lemmon Survey || — || align=right | 2.5 km || 
|-id=126 bgcolor=#E9E9E9
| 400126 ||  || — || October 3, 2006 || Mount Lemmon || Mount Lemmon Survey || — || align=right | 2.2 km || 
|-id=127 bgcolor=#E9E9E9
| 400127 ||  || — || October 18, 2006 || Kitt Peak || Spacewatch || — || align=right | 1.5 km || 
|-id=128 bgcolor=#d6d6d6
| 400128 ||  || — || October 19, 2006 || Kitt Peak || Spacewatch || — || align=right | 2.1 km || 
|-id=129 bgcolor=#E9E9E9
| 400129 ||  || — || October 19, 2006 || Kitt Peak || Spacewatch || — || align=right | 2.7 km || 
|-id=130 bgcolor=#E9E9E9
| 400130 ||  || — || October 2, 2006 || Mount Lemmon || Mount Lemmon Survey || EUN || align=right | 1.3 km || 
|-id=131 bgcolor=#E9E9E9
| 400131 ||  || — || October 19, 2006 || Kitt Peak || Spacewatch || — || align=right | 1.8 km || 
|-id=132 bgcolor=#E9E9E9
| 400132 ||  || — || October 20, 2006 || Kitt Peak || Spacewatch || — || align=right | 1.7 km || 
|-id=133 bgcolor=#E9E9E9
| 400133 ||  || — || October 21, 2006 || Mount Lemmon || Mount Lemmon Survey || — || align=right | 2.2 km || 
|-id=134 bgcolor=#E9E9E9
| 400134 ||  || — || October 16, 2006 || Catalina || CSS || — || align=right | 2.3 km || 
|-id=135 bgcolor=#E9E9E9
| 400135 ||  || — || October 16, 2006 || Catalina || CSS || (5) || align=right data-sort-value="0.93" | 930 m || 
|-id=136 bgcolor=#E9E9E9
| 400136 ||  || — || October 19, 2006 || Catalina || CSS || EUN || align=right | 1.2 km || 
|-id=137 bgcolor=#E9E9E9
| 400137 ||  || — || October 19, 2006 || Catalina || CSS || EUN || align=right | 1.5 km || 
|-id=138 bgcolor=#E9E9E9
| 400138 ||  || — || October 19, 2006 || Catalina || CSS || — || align=right | 1.6 km || 
|-id=139 bgcolor=#E9E9E9
| 400139 ||  || — || October 19, 2006 || Catalina || CSS || — || align=right | 1.8 km || 
|-id=140 bgcolor=#d6d6d6
| 400140 ||  || — || October 21, 2006 || Mount Lemmon || Mount Lemmon Survey || — || align=right | 3.8 km || 
|-id=141 bgcolor=#fefefe
| 400141 ||  || — || October 25, 2006 || Kuma Kogen || Y. Fujita || H || align=right data-sort-value="0.71" | 710 m || 
|-id=142 bgcolor=#E9E9E9
| 400142 ||  || — || October 19, 2006 || Mount Lemmon || Mount Lemmon Survey || EUN || align=right | 1.3 km || 
|-id=143 bgcolor=#E9E9E9
| 400143 ||  || — || October 20, 2006 || Palomar || NEAT || EUN || align=right | 1.2 km || 
|-id=144 bgcolor=#E9E9E9
| 400144 ||  || — || October 21, 2006 || Mount Lemmon || Mount Lemmon Survey || critical || align=right | 1.3 km || 
|-id=145 bgcolor=#E9E9E9
| 400145 ||  || — || October 27, 2006 || Mount Lemmon || Mount Lemmon Survey || — || align=right | 1.4 km || 
|-id=146 bgcolor=#d6d6d6
| 400146 ||  || — || October 27, 2006 || Mount Lemmon || Mount Lemmon Survey || — || align=right | 2.0 km || 
|-id=147 bgcolor=#E9E9E9
| 400147 ||  || — || October 20, 2006 || Kitt Peak || Spacewatch || — || align=right | 1.4 km || 
|-id=148 bgcolor=#E9E9E9
| 400148 ||  || — || October 30, 2006 || Catalina || CSS || — || align=right | 1.6 km || 
|-id=149 bgcolor=#E9E9E9
| 400149 ||  || — || October 31, 2006 || Mount Lemmon || Mount Lemmon Survey || — || align=right | 1.8 km || 
|-id=150 bgcolor=#E9E9E9
| 400150 ||  || — || October 17, 2006 || Catalina || CSS || JUN || align=right | 1.5 km || 
|-id=151 bgcolor=#E9E9E9
| 400151 ||  || — || October 17, 2006 || Mount Lemmon || Mount Lemmon Survey || — || align=right | 2.0 km || 
|-id=152 bgcolor=#FA8072
| 400152 ||  || — || November 11, 2006 || Socorro || LINEAR || — || align=right | 1.5 km || 
|-id=153 bgcolor=#E9E9E9
| 400153 ||  || — || November 11, 2006 || Socorro || LINEAR || — || align=right | 1.6 km || 
|-id=154 bgcolor=#E9E9E9
| 400154 ||  || — || November 10, 2006 || Kitt Peak || Spacewatch || — || align=right | 1.8 km || 
|-id=155 bgcolor=#E9E9E9
| 400155 ||  || — || October 20, 2006 || Mount Lemmon || Mount Lemmon Survey || critical || align=right | 1.5 km || 
|-id=156 bgcolor=#E9E9E9
| 400156 ||  || — || November 9, 2006 || Kitt Peak || Spacewatch || — || align=right | 1.8 km || 
|-id=157 bgcolor=#E9E9E9
| 400157 ||  || — || November 11, 2006 || Catalina || CSS || — || align=right | 1.4 km || 
|-id=158 bgcolor=#E9E9E9
| 400158 ||  || — || October 31, 2006 || Mount Lemmon || Mount Lemmon Survey || — || align=right | 1.4 km || 
|-id=159 bgcolor=#E9E9E9
| 400159 ||  || — || November 11, 2006 || Mount Lemmon || Mount Lemmon Survey || — || align=right | 2.5 km || 
|-id=160 bgcolor=#d6d6d6
| 400160 ||  || — || November 12, 2006 || Mount Lemmon || Mount Lemmon Survey || — || align=right | 4.6 km || 
|-id=161 bgcolor=#E9E9E9
| 400161 ||  || — || November 13, 2006 || Kitt Peak || Spacewatch || (5) || align=right data-sort-value="0.97" | 970 m || 
|-id=162 bgcolor=#E9E9E9
| 400162 SAIT ||  ||  || November 14, 2006 || San Marcello || A. Boattini, M. Mazzucato || — || align=right | 2.0 km || 
|-id=163 bgcolor=#E9E9E9
| 400163 ||  || — || November 13, 2006 || Kitt Peak || Spacewatch || — || align=right | 1.8 km || 
|-id=164 bgcolor=#E9E9E9
| 400164 ||  || — || November 13, 2006 || Kitt Peak || Spacewatch || — || align=right | 1.4 km || 
|-id=165 bgcolor=#E9E9E9
| 400165 ||  || — || November 13, 2006 || Palomar || NEAT || JUN || align=right | 1.2 km || 
|-id=166 bgcolor=#E9E9E9
| 400166 ||  || — || November 15, 2006 || Mount Lemmon || Mount Lemmon Survey || — || align=right | 2.4 km || 
|-id=167 bgcolor=#E9E9E9
| 400167 ||  || — || November 15, 2006 || Catalina || CSS || — || align=right | 1.5 km || 
|-id=168 bgcolor=#E9E9E9
| 400168 ||  || — || August 27, 2006 || Kitt Peak || Spacewatch || — || align=right | 2.3 km || 
|-id=169 bgcolor=#E9E9E9
| 400169 ||  || — || October 16, 2006 || Catalina || CSS || — || align=right | 1.7 km || 
|-id=170 bgcolor=#E9E9E9
| 400170 ||  || — || November 17, 2006 || Kitt Peak || Spacewatch || — || align=right | 1.8 km || 
|-id=171 bgcolor=#E9E9E9
| 400171 ||  || — || September 19, 2006 || Catalina || CSS || — || align=right | 2.8 km || 
|-id=172 bgcolor=#E9E9E9
| 400172 ||  || — || November 17, 2006 || Kitt Peak || Spacewatch || (5) || align=right data-sort-value="0.90" | 900 m || 
|-id=173 bgcolor=#E9E9E9
| 400173 ||  || — || November 17, 2006 || Mount Lemmon || Mount Lemmon Survey || AGN || align=right | 1.2 km || 
|-id=174 bgcolor=#E9E9E9
| 400174 ||  || — || November 17, 2006 || Mount Lemmon || Mount Lemmon Survey || ADE || align=right | 2.7 km || 
|-id=175 bgcolor=#d6d6d6
| 400175 ||  || — || November 16, 2006 || Mount Lemmon || Mount Lemmon Survey || — || align=right | 2.1 km || 
|-id=176 bgcolor=#E9E9E9
| 400176 ||  || — || November 18, 2006 || Mount Lemmon || Mount Lemmon Survey || (5) || align=right data-sort-value="0.84" | 840 m || 
|-id=177 bgcolor=#E9E9E9
| 400177 ||  || — || November 19, 2006 || Kitt Peak || Spacewatch || — || align=right | 1.9 km || 
|-id=178 bgcolor=#d6d6d6
| 400178 ||  || — || November 19, 2006 || Kitt Peak || Spacewatch || KOR || align=right | 1.2 km || 
|-id=179 bgcolor=#E9E9E9
| 400179 ||  || — || November 20, 2006 || Socorro || LINEAR || — || align=right | 1.5 km || 
|-id=180 bgcolor=#E9E9E9
| 400180 ||  || — || October 15, 2006 || Kitt Peak || Spacewatch || — || align=right | 1.1 km || 
|-id=181 bgcolor=#E9E9E9
| 400181 ||  || — || November 21, 2006 || Mount Lemmon || Mount Lemmon Survey || — || align=right | 1.5 km || 
|-id=182 bgcolor=#E9E9E9
| 400182 ||  || — || November 21, 2006 || Socorro || LINEAR || — || align=right | 2.4 km || 
|-id=183 bgcolor=#E9E9E9
| 400183 ||  || — || November 21, 2006 || Mount Lemmon || Mount Lemmon Survey || — || align=right | 1.6 km || 
|-id=184 bgcolor=#E9E9E9
| 400184 ||  || — || November 18, 2006 || Mount Lemmon || Mount Lemmon Survey || — || align=right | 2.1 km || 
|-id=185 bgcolor=#E9E9E9
| 400185 ||  || — || November 19, 2006 || Kitt Peak || Spacewatch || — || align=right | 1.5 km || 
|-id=186 bgcolor=#E9E9E9
| 400186 ||  || — || November 20, 2006 || Kitt Peak || Spacewatch || — || align=right | 2.2 km || 
|-id=187 bgcolor=#E9E9E9
| 400187 ||  || — || November 23, 2006 || Mount Lemmon || Mount Lemmon Survey || — || align=right | 1.6 km || 
|-id=188 bgcolor=#E9E9E9
| 400188 ||  || — || November 19, 2006 || Kitt Peak || Spacewatch || — || align=right | 2.4 km || 
|-id=189 bgcolor=#d6d6d6
| 400189 ||  || — || October 28, 2006 || Mount Lemmon || Mount Lemmon Survey || — || align=right | 2.7 km || 
|-id=190 bgcolor=#d6d6d6
| 400190 ||  || — || December 11, 2006 || Kitt Peak || Spacewatch || — || align=right | 4.3 km || 
|-id=191 bgcolor=#d6d6d6
| 400191 ||  || — || October 23, 2006 || Mount Lemmon || Mount Lemmon Survey || — || align=right | 3.0 km || 
|-id=192 bgcolor=#E9E9E9
| 400192 ||  || — || December 13, 2006 || Catalina || CSS || — || align=right | 3.1 km || 
|-id=193 bgcolor=#E9E9E9
| 400193 Castión ||  ||  || December 14, 2006 || San Marcello || A. Boattini, M. Mazzucato || — || align=right | 2.6 km || 
|-id=194 bgcolor=#E9E9E9
| 400194 ||  || — || December 14, 2006 || Palomar || NEAT || — || align=right | 2.9 km || 
|-id=195 bgcolor=#d6d6d6
| 400195 ||  || — || November 27, 2006 || Mount Lemmon || Mount Lemmon Survey || EOS || align=right | 2.1 km || 
|-id=196 bgcolor=#FA8072
| 400196 ||  || — || December 16, 2006 || Catalina || CSS || — || align=right | 1.9 km || 
|-id=197 bgcolor=#d6d6d6
| 400197 ||  || — || December 21, 2006 || Kitt Peak || Spacewatch || — || align=right | 3.7 km || 
|-id=198 bgcolor=#d6d6d6
| 400198 ||  || — || December 21, 2006 || Mount Lemmon || Mount Lemmon Survey || EOS || align=right | 1.8 km || 
|-id=199 bgcolor=#d6d6d6
| 400199 ||  || — || December 24, 2006 || Kitt Peak || Spacewatch || — || align=right | 3.3 km || 
|-id=200 bgcolor=#E9E9E9
| 400200 ||  || — || January 9, 2007 || Mount Lemmon || Mount Lemmon Survey || — || align=right | 2.8 km || 
|}

400201–400300 

|-bgcolor=#d6d6d6
| 400201 ||  || — || January 9, 2007 || Mount Lemmon || Mount Lemmon Survey || — || align=right | 2.6 km || 
|-id=202 bgcolor=#d6d6d6
| 400202 ||  || — || October 21, 2006 || Mount Lemmon || Mount Lemmon Survey || — || align=right | 3.9 km || 
|-id=203 bgcolor=#E9E9E9
| 400203 ||  || — || January 15, 2007 || Catalina || CSS || JUN || align=right | 1.0 km || 
|-id=204 bgcolor=#d6d6d6
| 400204 ||  || — || January 10, 2007 || Mount Lemmon || Mount Lemmon Survey || — || align=right | 2.3 km || 
|-id=205 bgcolor=#d6d6d6
| 400205 || 2007 BO || — || January 8, 2007 || Mount Lemmon || Mount Lemmon Survey || — || align=right | 3.4 km || 
|-id=206 bgcolor=#d6d6d6
| 400206 ||  || — || January 17, 2007 || Kitt Peak || Spacewatch || — || align=right | 3.7 km || 
|-id=207 bgcolor=#d6d6d6
| 400207 ||  || — || January 17, 2007 || Kitt Peak || Spacewatch || — || align=right | 2.4 km || 
|-id=208 bgcolor=#d6d6d6
| 400208 ||  || — || December 13, 2006 || Mount Lemmon || Mount Lemmon Survey || — || align=right | 3.3 km || 
|-id=209 bgcolor=#d6d6d6
| 400209 ||  || — || December 25, 2006 || Kitt Peak || Spacewatch || — || align=right | 2.8 km || 
|-id=210 bgcolor=#d6d6d6
| 400210 ||  || — || January 10, 2007 || Mount Lemmon || Mount Lemmon Survey || — || align=right | 3.9 km || 
|-id=211 bgcolor=#d6d6d6
| 400211 ||  || — || January 27, 2007 || Mount Lemmon || Mount Lemmon Survey || — || align=right | 3.2 km || 
|-id=212 bgcolor=#fefefe
| 400212 ||  || — || January 27, 2007 || Mount Lemmon || Mount Lemmon Survey || — || align=right data-sort-value="0.71" | 710 m || 
|-id=213 bgcolor=#d6d6d6
| 400213 ||  || — || January 24, 2007 || Mount Lemmon || Mount Lemmon Survey || — || align=right | 3.6 km || 
|-id=214 bgcolor=#d6d6d6
| 400214 ||  || — || January 27, 2007 || Mount Lemmon || Mount Lemmon Survey || HYG || align=right | 3.0 km || 
|-id=215 bgcolor=#d6d6d6
| 400215 ||  || — || October 29, 2005 || Mount Lemmon || Mount Lemmon Survey || THM || align=right | 2.6 km || 
|-id=216 bgcolor=#fefefe
| 400216 ||  || — || February 6, 2007 || Kitt Peak || Spacewatch || — || align=right data-sort-value="0.58" | 580 m || 
|-id=217 bgcolor=#d6d6d6
| 400217 ||  || — || February 6, 2007 || Mount Lemmon || Mount Lemmon Survey || — || align=right | 2.7 km || 
|-id=218 bgcolor=#d6d6d6
| 400218 ||  || — || February 6, 2007 || Mount Lemmon || Mount Lemmon Survey || TIR || align=right | 3.1 km || 
|-id=219 bgcolor=#d6d6d6
| 400219 ||  || — || January 13, 2007 || Socorro || LINEAR || — || align=right | 4.6 km || 
|-id=220 bgcolor=#d6d6d6
| 400220 ||  || — || November 16, 2006 || Mount Lemmon || Mount Lemmon Survey || EUP || align=right | 3.9 km || 
|-id=221 bgcolor=#d6d6d6
| 400221 ||  || — || February 17, 2007 || Kitt Peak || Spacewatch || EOS || align=right | 2.2 km || 
|-id=222 bgcolor=#d6d6d6
| 400222 ||  || — || February 17, 2007 || Kitt Peak || Spacewatch || THM || align=right | 2.1 km || 
|-id=223 bgcolor=#d6d6d6
| 400223 ||  || — || February 23, 2007 || Mount Lemmon || Mount Lemmon Survey || EOS || align=right | 1.9 km || 
|-id=224 bgcolor=#d6d6d6
| 400224 ||  || — || January 28, 2007 || Mount Lemmon || Mount Lemmon Survey || — || align=right | 2.8 km || 
|-id=225 bgcolor=#d6d6d6
| 400225 ||  || — || February 25, 2007 || Mount Lemmon || Mount Lemmon Survey || — || align=right | 3.5 km || 
|-id=226 bgcolor=#d6d6d6
| 400226 ||  || — || February 26, 2007 || Mount Lemmon || Mount Lemmon Survey || — || align=right | 3.2 km || 
|-id=227 bgcolor=#d6d6d6
| 400227 ||  || — || February 6, 2007 || Mount Lemmon || Mount Lemmon Survey || — || align=right | 3.6 km || 
|-id=228 bgcolor=#fefefe
| 400228 ||  || — || March 11, 2007 || Kitt Peak || Spacewatch || — || align=right data-sort-value="0.74" | 740 m || 
|-id=229 bgcolor=#fefefe
| 400229 ||  || — || March 13, 2007 || Mount Lemmon || Mount Lemmon Survey || — || align=right data-sort-value="0.73" | 730 m || 
|-id=230 bgcolor=#d6d6d6
| 400230 ||  || — || March 12, 2007 || Kitt Peak || Spacewatch || EOS || align=right | 2.3 km || 
|-id=231 bgcolor=#fefefe
| 400231 ||  || — || November 25, 2005 || Mount Lemmon || Mount Lemmon Survey || — || align=right data-sort-value="0.67" | 670 m || 
|-id=232 bgcolor=#d6d6d6
| 400232 ||  || — || March 11, 2007 || Kitt Peak || Spacewatch || — || align=right | 4.2 km || 
|-id=233 bgcolor=#fefefe
| 400233 ||  || — || March 19, 2007 || Catalina || CSS || — || align=right data-sort-value="0.89" | 890 m || 
|-id=234 bgcolor=#d6d6d6
| 400234 ||  || — || February 22, 2001 || Kitt Peak || Spacewatch || — || align=right | 2.8 km || 
|-id=235 bgcolor=#fefefe
| 400235 ||  || — || April 14, 2007 || Kitt Peak || Spacewatch || — || align=right data-sort-value="0.73" | 730 m || 
|-id=236 bgcolor=#d6d6d6
| 400236 ||  || — || April 22, 2007 || Kitt Peak || Spacewatch || — || align=right | 3.3 km || 
|-id=237 bgcolor=#fefefe
| 400237 ||  || — || April 22, 2007 || Mount Lemmon || Mount Lemmon Survey || — || align=right data-sort-value="0.65" | 650 m || 
|-id=238 bgcolor=#d6d6d6
| 400238 ||  || — || April 22, 2007 || Mount Lemmon || Mount Lemmon Survey || — || align=right | 3.5 km || 
|-id=239 bgcolor=#fefefe
| 400239 ||  || — || March 16, 2007 || Mount Lemmon || Mount Lemmon Survey || — || align=right data-sort-value="0.73" | 730 m || 
|-id=240 bgcolor=#fefefe
| 400240 ||  || — || April 25, 2007 || Mount Lemmon || Mount Lemmon Survey || — || align=right data-sort-value="0.68" | 680 m || 
|-id=241 bgcolor=#fefefe
| 400241 ||  || — || May 11, 2007 || Mount Lemmon || Mount Lemmon Survey || — || align=right data-sort-value="0.67" | 670 m || 
|-id=242 bgcolor=#FA8072
| 400242 ||  || — || July 15, 2007 || Reedy Creek || J. Broughton || — || align=right data-sort-value="0.98" | 980 m || 
|-id=243 bgcolor=#fefefe
| 400243 ||  || — || July 21, 2007 || Reedy Creek || J. Broughton || — || align=right data-sort-value="0.98" | 980 m || 
|-id=244 bgcolor=#fefefe
| 400244 ||  || — || August 12, 2007 || Pla D'Arguines || R. Ferrando || V || align=right data-sort-value="0.82" | 820 m || 
|-id=245 bgcolor=#fefefe
| 400245 ||  || — || August 9, 2007 || Socorro || LINEAR || — || align=right data-sort-value="0.86" | 860 m || 
|-id=246 bgcolor=#fefefe
| 400246 ||  || — || August 12, 2007 || Socorro || LINEAR || — || align=right | 1.1 km || 
|-id=247 bgcolor=#fefefe
| 400247 ||  || — || August 12, 2007 || Socorro || LINEAR || — || align=right data-sort-value="0.79" | 790 m || 
|-id=248 bgcolor=#fefefe
| 400248 ||  || — || August 8, 2007 || Socorro || LINEAR || — || align=right data-sort-value="0.66" | 660 m || 
|-id=249 bgcolor=#fefefe
| 400249 ||  || — || August 11, 2007 || Socorro || LINEAR || — || align=right data-sort-value="0.91" | 910 m || 
|-id=250 bgcolor=#fefefe
| 400250 ||  || — || August 13, 2007 || Socorro || LINEAR || — || align=right | 1.4 km || 
|-id=251 bgcolor=#fefefe
| 400251 ||  || — || August 13, 2007 || Socorro || LINEAR || (2076) || align=right data-sort-value="0.80" | 800 m || 
|-id=252 bgcolor=#fefefe
| 400252 ||  || — || August 10, 2007 || Kitt Peak || Spacewatch || — || align=right data-sort-value="0.80" | 800 m || 
|-id=253 bgcolor=#fefefe
| 400253 ||  || — || August 9, 2007 || Socorro || LINEAR || — || align=right data-sort-value="0.76" | 760 m || 
|-id=254 bgcolor=#fefefe
| 400254 || 2007 RC || — || September 1, 2007 || Eskridge || G. Hug || — || align=right data-sort-value="0.72" | 720 m || 
|-id=255 bgcolor=#fefefe
| 400255 ||  || — || September 3, 2007 || Catalina || CSS || — || align=right | 1.2 km || 
|-id=256 bgcolor=#fefefe
| 400256 ||  || — || September 3, 2007 || Catalina || CSS || — || align=right | 1.0 km || 
|-id=257 bgcolor=#fefefe
| 400257 ||  || — || September 4, 2007 || Mount Lemmon || Mount Lemmon Survey || NYS || align=right data-sort-value="0.52" | 520 m || 
|-id=258 bgcolor=#fefefe
| 400258 ||  || — || September 8, 2007 || Anderson Mesa || LONEOS || — || align=right data-sort-value="0.82" | 820 m || 
|-id=259 bgcolor=#fefefe
| 400259 ||  || — || August 10, 2007 || Kitt Peak || Spacewatch || MAS || align=right data-sort-value="0.65" | 650 m || 
|-id=260 bgcolor=#fefefe
| 400260 ||  || — || September 10, 2007 || Mount Lemmon || Mount Lemmon Survey || NYS || align=right data-sort-value="0.74" | 740 m || 
|-id=261 bgcolor=#fefefe
| 400261 ||  || — || September 11, 2007 || Kitt Peak || Spacewatch || — || align=right data-sort-value="0.65" | 650 m || 
|-id=262 bgcolor=#fefefe
| 400262 ||  || — || September 11, 2007 || Kitt Peak || Spacewatch || — || align=right data-sort-value="0.78" | 780 m || 
|-id=263 bgcolor=#d6d6d6
| 400263 ||  || — || September 14, 2007 || Anderson Mesa || LONEOS || SHU3:2 || align=right | 6.0 km || 
|-id=264 bgcolor=#fefefe
| 400264 ||  || — || September 3, 2007 || Catalina || CSS || NYS || align=right data-sort-value="0.63" | 630 m || 
|-id=265 bgcolor=#fefefe
| 400265 ||  || — || August 23, 2007 || Kitt Peak || Spacewatch || NYS || align=right data-sort-value="0.72" | 720 m || 
|-id=266 bgcolor=#fefefe
| 400266 ||  || — || September 11, 2007 || XuYi || PMO NEO || — || align=right | 1.00 km || 
|-id=267 bgcolor=#fefefe
| 400267 ||  || — || September 12, 2007 || Catalina || CSS || — || align=right data-sort-value="0.74" | 740 m || 
|-id=268 bgcolor=#fefefe
| 400268 ||  || — || September 12, 2007 || Catalina || CSS || ERI || align=right | 1.4 km || 
|-id=269 bgcolor=#fefefe
| 400269 ||  || — || August 10, 2007 || Kitt Peak || Spacewatch || MAS || align=right data-sort-value="0.80" | 800 m || 
|-id=270 bgcolor=#fefefe
| 400270 ||  || — || September 13, 2007 || Mount Lemmon || Mount Lemmon Survey || — || align=right data-sort-value="0.82" | 820 m || 
|-id=271 bgcolor=#fefefe
| 400271 ||  || — || September 14, 2007 || Mount Lemmon || Mount Lemmon Survey || — || align=right data-sort-value="0.75" | 750 m || 
|-id=272 bgcolor=#fefefe
| 400272 ||  || — || September 10, 2007 || Kitt Peak || Spacewatch || — || align=right data-sort-value="0.78" | 780 m || 
|-id=273 bgcolor=#fefefe
| 400273 ||  || — || August 12, 2007 || Socorro || LINEAR || — || align=right data-sort-value="0.94" | 940 m || 
|-id=274 bgcolor=#fefefe
| 400274 ||  || — || September 12, 2007 || Mount Lemmon || Mount Lemmon Survey || — || align=right data-sort-value="0.80" | 800 m || 
|-id=275 bgcolor=#fefefe
| 400275 ||  || — || September 3, 2007 || Catalina || CSS || — || align=right data-sort-value="0.83" | 830 m || 
|-id=276 bgcolor=#fefefe
| 400276 ||  || — || August 21, 2007 || Anderson Mesa || LONEOS || critical || align=right data-sort-value="0.78" | 780 m || 
|-id=277 bgcolor=#fefefe
| 400277 ||  || — || August 23, 2007 || Kitt Peak || Spacewatch || — || align=right data-sort-value="0.81" | 810 m || 
|-id=278 bgcolor=#fefefe
| 400278 ||  || — || September 12, 2007 || Mount Lemmon || Mount Lemmon Survey || — || align=right data-sort-value="0.77" | 770 m || 
|-id=279 bgcolor=#fefefe
| 400279 ||  || — || September 9, 2007 || Mount Lemmon || Mount Lemmon Survey || — || align=right data-sort-value="0.68" | 680 m || 
|-id=280 bgcolor=#fefefe
| 400280 ||  || — || September 5, 2007 || Catalina || CSS || — || align=right data-sort-value="0.99" | 990 m || 
|-id=281 bgcolor=#fefefe
| 400281 ||  || — || September 4, 2007 || Catalina || CSS || — || align=right | 1.1 km || 
|-id=282 bgcolor=#fefefe
| 400282 ||  || — || September 3, 2007 || Catalina || CSS || — || align=right data-sort-value="0.67" | 670 m || 
|-id=283 bgcolor=#fefefe
| 400283 ||  || — || September 16, 2007 || Socorro || LINEAR || NYS || align=right data-sort-value="0.71" | 710 m || 
|-id=284 bgcolor=#fefefe
| 400284 ||  || — || September 19, 2007 || Kitt Peak || Spacewatch || — || align=right data-sort-value="0.84" | 840 m || 
|-id=285 bgcolor=#fefefe
| 400285 ||  || — || September 18, 2007 || Mount Lemmon || Mount Lemmon Survey || MAS || align=right data-sort-value="0.71" | 710 m || 
|-id=286 bgcolor=#fefefe
| 400286 ||  || — || September 8, 2007 || Anderson Mesa || LONEOS || MAS || align=right data-sort-value="0.81" | 810 m || 
|-id=287 bgcolor=#fefefe
| 400287 ||  || — || September 11, 2007 || Mount Lemmon || Mount Lemmon Survey || NYS || align=right data-sort-value="0.80" | 800 m || 
|-id=288 bgcolor=#E9E9E9
| 400288 ||  || — || October 7, 2007 || Mount Lemmon || Mount Lemmon Survey || — || align=right | 1.3 km || 
|-id=289 bgcolor=#fefefe
| 400289 ||  || — || October 4, 2007 || Kitt Peak || Spacewatch || — || align=right data-sort-value="0.89" | 890 m || 
|-id=290 bgcolor=#fefefe
| 400290 ||  || — || October 7, 2007 || Mount Lemmon || Mount Lemmon Survey || MAS || align=right data-sort-value="0.72" | 720 m || 
|-id=291 bgcolor=#E9E9E9
| 400291 ||  || — || October 14, 2007 || Wrightwood || J. W. Young || — || align=right | 1.6 km || 
|-id=292 bgcolor=#fefefe
| 400292 ||  || — || October 5, 2007 || Kitt Peak || Spacewatch || NYS || align=right data-sort-value="0.73" | 730 m || 
|-id=293 bgcolor=#fefefe
| 400293 ||  || — || October 8, 2007 || Mount Lemmon || Mount Lemmon Survey || NYS || align=right data-sort-value="0.58" | 580 m || 
|-id=294 bgcolor=#fefefe
| 400294 ||  || — || October 13, 2007 || Dauban || Chante-Perdrix Obs. || — || align=right data-sort-value="0.92" | 920 m || 
|-id=295 bgcolor=#fefefe
| 400295 ||  || — || September 3, 2007 || Catalina || CSS || — || align=right | 1.1 km || 
|-id=296 bgcolor=#E9E9E9
| 400296 ||  || — || October 9, 2007 || Kitt Peak || Spacewatch || — || align=right | 2.6 km || 
|-id=297 bgcolor=#d6d6d6
| 400297 ||  || — || October 6, 2007 || Kitt Peak || Spacewatch || Tj (2.96) || align=right | 4.6 km || 
|-id=298 bgcolor=#E9E9E9
| 400298 ||  || — || September 15, 2007 || Mount Lemmon || Mount Lemmon Survey || — || align=right | 1.4 km || 
|-id=299 bgcolor=#fefefe
| 400299 ||  || — || September 9, 2007 || Mount Lemmon || Mount Lemmon Survey || — || align=right data-sort-value="0.75" | 750 m || 
|-id=300 bgcolor=#fefefe
| 400300 ||  || — || October 6, 2007 || Kitt Peak || Spacewatch || — || align=right data-sort-value="0.87" | 870 m || 
|}

400301–400400 

|-bgcolor=#fefefe
| 400301 ||  || — || October 8, 2007 || Kitt Peak || Spacewatch || — || align=right data-sort-value="0.75" | 750 m || 
|-id=302 bgcolor=#fefefe
| 400302 ||  || — || October 8, 2007 || Kitt Peak || Spacewatch || MAS || align=right data-sort-value="0.84" | 840 m || 
|-id=303 bgcolor=#fefefe
| 400303 ||  || — || October 8, 2007 || Socorro || LINEAR || — || align=right | 1.0 km || 
|-id=304 bgcolor=#fefefe
| 400304 ||  || — || October 9, 2007 || Socorro || LINEAR || — || align=right data-sort-value="0.98" | 980 m || 
|-id=305 bgcolor=#fefefe
| 400305 ||  || — || October 9, 2007 || Socorro || LINEAR || NYS || align=right data-sort-value="0.69" | 690 m || 
|-id=306 bgcolor=#fefefe
| 400306 ||  || — || October 8, 2007 || Anderson Mesa || LONEOS || — || align=right | 1.3 km || 
|-id=307 bgcolor=#fefefe
| 400307 ||  || — || October 10, 2007 || Catalina || CSS || — || align=right | 1.1 km || 
|-id=308 bgcolor=#E9E9E9
| 400308 Antonkutter ||  ||  || October 13, 2007 || Gaisberg || R. Gierlinger || — || align=right | 1.1 km || 
|-id=309 bgcolor=#fefefe
| 400309 Ralfhofner ||  ||  || October 14, 2007 || Radebeul || M. Fiedler || — || align=right data-sort-value="0.82" | 820 m || 
|-id=310 bgcolor=#fefefe
| 400310 ||  || — || October 13, 2007 || Socorro || LINEAR || — || align=right data-sort-value="0.99" | 990 m || 
|-id=311 bgcolor=#fefefe
| 400311 ||  || — || October 8, 2007 || Catalina || CSS || — || align=right data-sort-value="0.72" | 720 m || 
|-id=312 bgcolor=#d6d6d6
| 400312 ||  || — || October 8, 2007 || Catalina || CSS || (3561)3:2 || align=right | 9.1 km || 
|-id=313 bgcolor=#fefefe
| 400313 ||  || — || September 12, 2007 || Mount Lemmon || Mount Lemmon Survey || NYS || align=right data-sort-value="0.71" | 710 m || 
|-id=314 bgcolor=#E9E9E9
| 400314 ||  || — || October 7, 2007 || Mount Lemmon || Mount Lemmon Survey || — || align=right | 2.7 km || 
|-id=315 bgcolor=#E9E9E9
| 400315 ||  || — || November 18, 2003 || Kitt Peak || Spacewatch || — || align=right | 1.4 km || 
|-id=316 bgcolor=#fefefe
| 400316 ||  || — || October 11, 2007 || Kitt Peak || Spacewatch || — || align=right data-sort-value="0.91" | 910 m || 
|-id=317 bgcolor=#d6d6d6
| 400317 ||  || — || October 11, 2007 || Kitt Peak || Spacewatch || Tj (2.96) || align=right | 3.5 km || 
|-id=318 bgcolor=#fefefe
| 400318 ||  || — || October 11, 2007 || Catalina || CSS || — || align=right data-sort-value="0.78" | 780 m || 
|-id=319 bgcolor=#fefefe
| 400319 ||  || — || October 11, 2007 || Lulin Observatory || LUSS || — || align=right data-sort-value="0.92" | 920 m || 
|-id=320 bgcolor=#d6d6d6
| 400320 ||  || — || October 12, 2007 || Kitt Peak || Spacewatch || 3:2 || align=right | 4.4 km || 
|-id=321 bgcolor=#fefefe
| 400321 ||  || — || October 10, 2007 || Catalina || CSS || — || align=right | 1.0 km || 
|-id=322 bgcolor=#fefefe
| 400322 ||  || — || October 15, 2007 || Anderson Mesa || LONEOS || — || align=right data-sort-value="0.98" | 980 m || 
|-id=323 bgcolor=#fefefe
| 400323 ||  || — || September 12, 2007 || Mount Lemmon || Mount Lemmon Survey || MAS || align=right data-sort-value="0.78" | 780 m || 
|-id=324 bgcolor=#fefefe
| 400324 ||  || — || October 14, 2007 || Catalina || CSS || — || align=right data-sort-value="0.74" | 740 m || 
|-id=325 bgcolor=#fefefe
| 400325 ||  || — || October 12, 2007 || Kitt Peak || Spacewatch || — || align=right data-sort-value="0.74" | 740 m || 
|-id=326 bgcolor=#E9E9E9
| 400326 ||  || — || October 7, 2007 || Mount Lemmon || Mount Lemmon Survey || — || align=right | 1.8 km || 
|-id=327 bgcolor=#fefefe
| 400327 ||  || — || October 7, 2007 || Catalina || CSS || — || align=right data-sort-value="0.85" | 850 m || 
|-id=328 bgcolor=#E9E9E9
| 400328 ||  || — || October 11, 2007 || Kitt Peak || Spacewatch || EUN || align=right | 1.3 km || 
|-id=329 bgcolor=#E9E9E9
| 400329 ||  || — || October 16, 2007 || Catalina || CSS || — || align=right | 1.6 km || 
|-id=330 bgcolor=#fefefe
| 400330 ||  || — || October 18, 2007 || Anderson Mesa || LONEOS || — || align=right | 1.1 km || 
|-id=331 bgcolor=#fefefe
| 400331 ||  || — || October 16, 2007 || Catalina || CSS || — || align=right | 1.1 km || 
|-id=332 bgcolor=#fefefe
| 400332 ||  || — || October 17, 2007 || Anderson Mesa || Mount Lemmon Survey || — || align=right data-sort-value="0.82" | 820 m || 
|-id=333 bgcolor=#fefefe
| 400333 ||  || — || October 16, 2007 || Catalina || CSS || — || align=right | 1.1 km || 
|-id=334 bgcolor=#E9E9E9
| 400334 ||  || — || October 16, 2007 || Catalina || CSS || KON || align=right | 2.1 km || 
|-id=335 bgcolor=#fefefe
| 400335 ||  || — || October 18, 2007 || Anderson Mesa || LONEOS || — || align=right | 1.2 km || 
|-id=336 bgcolor=#E9E9E9
| 400336 ||  || — || October 6, 2007 || Kitt Peak || Spacewatch || — || align=right | 1.8 km || 
|-id=337 bgcolor=#fefefe
| 400337 ||  || — || October 31, 2007 || Gnosca || S. Sposetti || — || align=right data-sort-value="0.70" | 700 m || 
|-id=338 bgcolor=#E9E9E9
| 400338 ||  || — || October 10, 2007 || Kitt Peak || Spacewatch || — || align=right | 1.6 km || 
|-id=339 bgcolor=#fefefe
| 400339 ||  || — || October 30, 2007 || Kitt Peak || Spacewatch || MAS || align=right data-sort-value="0.82" | 820 m || 
|-id=340 bgcolor=#E9E9E9
| 400340 ||  || — || October 16, 2007 || Anderson Mesa || Mount Lemmon Survey || — || align=right | 1.3 km || 
|-id=341 bgcolor=#fefefe
| 400341 ||  || — || October 20, 2007 || Mount Lemmon || Mount Lemmon Survey || — || align=right | 1.2 km || 
|-id=342 bgcolor=#fefefe
| 400342 ||  || — || October 20, 2007 || Mount Lemmon || Mount Lemmon Survey || NYS || align=right data-sort-value="0.76" | 760 m || 
|-id=343 bgcolor=#E9E9E9
| 400343 ||  || — || November 2, 2007 || Socorro || LINEAR || — || align=right | 1.9 km || 
|-id=344 bgcolor=#E9E9E9
| 400344 ||  || — || October 16, 2007 || Catalina || CSS || — || align=right | 1.5 km || 
|-id=345 bgcolor=#d6d6d6
| 400345 ||  || — || November 3, 2007 || Mount Lemmon || Mount Lemmon Survey || 3:2 || align=right | 4.1 km || 
|-id=346 bgcolor=#E9E9E9
| 400346 ||  || — || November 1, 2007 || Kitt Peak || Spacewatch || — || align=right | 1.0 km || 
|-id=347 bgcolor=#fefefe
| 400347 ||  || — || November 1, 2007 || Kitt Peak || Spacewatch || — || align=right | 1.0 km || 
|-id=348 bgcolor=#E9E9E9
| 400348 ||  || — || October 16, 2007 || Mount Lemmon || Mount Lemmon Survey || — || align=right data-sort-value="0.94" | 940 m || 
|-id=349 bgcolor=#E9E9E9
| 400349 ||  || — || October 16, 2007 || Mount Lemmon || Mount Lemmon Survey || EUN || align=right | 1.1 km || 
|-id=350 bgcolor=#E9E9E9
| 400350 ||  || — || November 7, 2007 || Mayhill || A. Lowe || (5) || align=right data-sort-value="0.93" | 930 m || 
|-id=351 bgcolor=#E9E9E9
| 400351 ||  || — || November 7, 2007 || Socorro || LINEAR || HNS || align=right | 1.5 km || 
|-id=352 bgcolor=#E9E9E9
| 400352 ||  || — || October 24, 2007 || Mount Lemmon || Mount Lemmon Survey || (5) || align=right data-sort-value="0.81" | 810 m || 
|-id=353 bgcolor=#fefefe
| 400353 ||  || — || November 3, 2007 || Kitt Peak || Spacewatch || — || align=right data-sort-value="0.83" | 830 m || 
|-id=354 bgcolor=#fefefe
| 400354 ||  || — || November 3, 2007 || Kitt Peak || Spacewatch || — || align=right data-sort-value="0.95" | 950 m || 
|-id=355 bgcolor=#fefefe
| 400355 ||  || — || November 3, 2007 || Kitt Peak || Spacewatch || H || align=right data-sort-value="0.65" | 650 m || 
|-id=356 bgcolor=#fefefe
| 400356 ||  || — || November 3, 2007 || Mount Lemmon || Mount Lemmon Survey || H || align=right data-sort-value="0.88" | 880 m || 
|-id=357 bgcolor=#E9E9E9
| 400357 ||  || — || November 5, 2007 || Kitt Peak || Spacewatch || — || align=right | 1.3 km || 
|-id=358 bgcolor=#E9E9E9
| 400358 ||  || — || November 5, 2007 || Kitt Peak || Spacewatch || EUN || align=right | 1.3 km || 
|-id=359 bgcolor=#d6d6d6
| 400359 ||  || — || November 2, 2007 || Mount Lemmon || Mount Lemmon Survey || Tj (2.93) || align=right | 4.2 km || 
|-id=360 bgcolor=#d6d6d6
| 400360 ||  || — || November 7, 2007 || Catalina || CSS || 3:2 || align=right | 5.0 km || 
|-id=361 bgcolor=#E9E9E9
| 400361 ||  || — || October 5, 2007 || Kitt Peak || Spacewatch || HNS || align=right | 1.00 km || 
|-id=362 bgcolor=#fefefe
| 400362 ||  || — || November 9, 2007 || Kitt Peak || Spacewatch || — || align=right data-sort-value="0.82" | 820 m || 
|-id=363 bgcolor=#E9E9E9
| 400363 ||  || — || October 20, 2007 || Mount Lemmon || Mount Lemmon Survey || ADE || align=right | 2.1 km || 
|-id=364 bgcolor=#fefefe
| 400364 ||  || — || November 11, 2007 || Mount Lemmon || Mount Lemmon Survey || — || align=right data-sort-value="0.92" | 920 m || 
|-id=365 bgcolor=#E9E9E9
| 400365 ||  || — || September 12, 2007 || Catalina || CSS || — || align=right | 3.4 km || 
|-id=366 bgcolor=#E9E9E9
| 400366 ||  || — || November 1, 2007 || Kitt Peak || Spacewatch || — || align=right | 1.2 km || 
|-id=367 bgcolor=#E9E9E9
| 400367 ||  || — || November 7, 2007 || Kitt Peak || Spacewatch || — || align=right data-sort-value="0.93" | 930 m || 
|-id=368 bgcolor=#E9E9E9
| 400368 ||  || — || November 8, 2007 || Kitt Peak || Spacewatch || — || align=right data-sort-value="0.86" | 860 m || 
|-id=369 bgcolor=#E9E9E9
| 400369 ||  || — || November 8, 2007 || Mount Lemmon || Mount Lemmon Survey || — || align=right | 1.4 km || 
|-id=370 bgcolor=#E9E9E9
| 400370 ||  || — || November 19, 2007 || Mount Lemmon || Mount Lemmon Survey || BAR || align=right | 1.3 km || 
|-id=371 bgcolor=#E9E9E9
| 400371 ||  || — || November 17, 2007 || Mount Lemmon || Mount Lemmon Survey || — || align=right | 1.3 km || 
|-id=372 bgcolor=#fefefe
| 400372 ||  || — || November 17, 2007 || Kitt Peak || Spacewatch || — || align=right data-sort-value="0.90" | 900 m || 
|-id=373 bgcolor=#fefefe
| 400373 ||  || — || November 19, 2007 || Kitt Peak || Spacewatch || — || align=right data-sort-value="0.99" | 990 m || 
|-id=374 bgcolor=#fefefe
| 400374 ||  || — || November 20, 2007 || Mount Lemmon || Mount Lemmon Survey || — || align=right | 1.0 km || 
|-id=375 bgcolor=#E9E9E9
| 400375 ||  || — || November 21, 2007 || Catalina || CSS || GAL || align=right | 1.9 km || 
|-id=376 bgcolor=#fefefe
| 400376 ||  || — || December 3, 2007 || Kitt Peak || Spacewatch || H || align=right data-sort-value="0.77" | 770 m || 
|-id=377 bgcolor=#E9E9E9
| 400377 ||  || — || November 8, 2007 || Mount Lemmon || Mount Lemmon Survey || — || align=right | 1.4 km || 
|-id=378 bgcolor=#fefefe
| 400378 ||  || — || December 3, 2007 || Catalina || CSS || H || align=right | 1.0 km || 
|-id=379 bgcolor=#E9E9E9
| 400379 ||  || — || December 4, 2007 || Kitt Peak || Spacewatch || — || align=right | 1.2 km || 
|-id=380 bgcolor=#E9E9E9
| 400380 ||  || — || December 14, 2007 || Mount Lemmon || Mount Lemmon Survey || — || align=right data-sort-value="0.94" | 940 m || 
|-id=381 bgcolor=#E9E9E9
| 400381 ||  || — || December 17, 2007 || Mount Lemmon || Mount Lemmon Survey || EUN || align=right | 1.4 km || 
|-id=382 bgcolor=#FA8072
| 400382 ||  || — || December 30, 2007 || Socorro || LINEAR || H || align=right data-sort-value="0.80" | 800 m || 
|-id=383 bgcolor=#E9E9E9
| 400383 ||  || — || December 3, 2007 || Kitt Peak || Spacewatch || HNS || align=right | 1.4 km || 
|-id=384 bgcolor=#fefefe
| 400384 ||  || — || November 8, 2007 || Mount Lemmon || Mount Lemmon Survey || — || align=right data-sort-value="0.93" | 930 m || 
|-id=385 bgcolor=#fefefe
| 400385 ||  || — || December 30, 2007 || Mount Lemmon || Mount Lemmon Survey || H || align=right data-sort-value="0.83" | 830 m || 
|-id=386 bgcolor=#E9E9E9
| 400386 ||  || — || December 5, 2007 || Mount Lemmon || Mount Lemmon Survey || EUN || align=right | 1.4 km || 
|-id=387 bgcolor=#E9E9E9
| 400387 ||  || — || December 30, 2007 || Junk Bond || D. Healy || — || align=right | 2.8 km || 
|-id=388 bgcolor=#E9E9E9
| 400388 ||  || — || December 15, 2007 || Mount Lemmon || Mount Lemmon Survey || HNS || align=right | 1.2 km || 
|-id=389 bgcolor=#E9E9E9
| 400389 ||  || — || December 31, 2007 || Mount Lemmon || Mount Lemmon Survey || JUN || align=right | 1.2 km || 
|-id=390 bgcolor=#E9E9E9
| 400390 || 2008 AH || — || December 14, 2007 || Mount Lemmon || Mount Lemmon Survey || MAR || align=right | 1.5 km || 
|-id=391 bgcolor=#E9E9E9
| 400391 ||  || — || November 13, 2007 || Kitt Peak || Spacewatch || — || align=right | 1.3 km || 
|-id=392 bgcolor=#E9E9E9
| 400392 ||  || — || January 10, 2008 || Kitt Peak || Spacewatch || — || align=right | 2.2 km || 
|-id=393 bgcolor=#fefefe
| 400393 ||  || — || January 11, 2008 || Mount Lemmon || Mount Lemmon Survey || V || align=right data-sort-value="0.75" | 750 m || 
|-id=394 bgcolor=#E9E9E9
| 400394 ||  || — || January 11, 2008 || Mount Lemmon || Mount Lemmon Survey || — || align=right | 1.5 km || 
|-id=395 bgcolor=#d6d6d6
| 400395 ||  || — || January 12, 2008 || Kitt Peak || Spacewatch || — || align=right | 3.0 km || 
|-id=396 bgcolor=#E9E9E9
| 400396 ||  || — || January 12, 2008 || Kitt Peak || Spacewatch || — || align=right | 2.1 km || 
|-id=397 bgcolor=#d6d6d6
| 400397 ||  || — || January 12, 2008 || Kitt Peak || Spacewatch || — || align=right | 2.1 km || 
|-id=398 bgcolor=#E9E9E9
| 400398 ||  || — || January 14, 2008 || Kitt Peak || Spacewatch || — || align=right | 2.6 km || 
|-id=399 bgcolor=#fefefe
| 400399 ||  || — || January 14, 2008 || Kitt Peak || Spacewatch || — || align=right data-sort-value="0.92" | 920 m || 
|-id=400 bgcolor=#E9E9E9
| 400400 ||  || — || December 31, 2007 || Kitt Peak || Spacewatch || — || align=right | 2.0 km || 
|}

400401–400500 

|-bgcolor=#E9E9E9
| 400401 ||  || — || January 15, 2008 || Kitt Peak || Spacewatch || HNS || align=right | 1.3 km || 
|-id=402 bgcolor=#E9E9E9
| 400402 ||  || — || January 15, 2008 || Kitt Peak || Spacewatch || — || align=right | 2.1 km || 
|-id=403 bgcolor=#E9E9E9
| 400403 ||  || — || November 18, 2007 || Mount Lemmon || Mount Lemmon Survey || — || align=right | 2.5 km || 
|-id=404 bgcolor=#E9E9E9
| 400404 ||  || — || December 18, 2007 || Mount Lemmon || Mount Lemmon Survey || — || align=right | 1.2 km || 
|-id=405 bgcolor=#E9E9E9
| 400405 ||  || — || January 30, 2008 || Catalina || CSS || — || align=right | 2.7 km || 
|-id=406 bgcolor=#E9E9E9
| 400406 ||  || — || January 30, 2008 || Catalina || CSS || — || align=right | 2.4 km || 
|-id=407 bgcolor=#E9E9E9
| 400407 ||  || — || January 30, 2008 || Catalina || CSS || (5) || align=right | 1.0 km || 
|-id=408 bgcolor=#d6d6d6
| 400408 ||  || — || January 31, 2008 || Mount Lemmon || Mount Lemmon Survey || — || align=right | 5.0 km || 
|-id=409 bgcolor=#d6d6d6
| 400409 ||  || — || February 7, 2008 || Mount Lemmon || Mount Lemmon Survey || EUP || align=right | 4.2 km || 
|-id=410 bgcolor=#E9E9E9
| 400410 ||  || — || February 3, 2008 || Mount Lemmon || Mount Lemmon Survey || — || align=right | 2.0 km || 
|-id=411 bgcolor=#fefefe
| 400411 ||  || — || February 5, 2008 || La Sagra || OAM Obs. || H || align=right data-sort-value="0.77" | 770 m || 
|-id=412 bgcolor=#E9E9E9
| 400412 ||  || — || September 24, 2007 || Kitt Peak || Spacewatch || — || align=right | 1.7 km || 
|-id=413 bgcolor=#E9E9E9
| 400413 ||  || — || February 2, 2008 || Kitt Peak || Spacewatch || — || align=right | 2.4 km || 
|-id=414 bgcolor=#E9E9E9
| 400414 ||  || — || December 16, 2007 || Kitt Peak || Spacewatch || — || align=right | 3.0 km || 
|-id=415 bgcolor=#E9E9E9
| 400415 ||  || — || February 3, 2008 || Kitt Peak || Spacewatch || — || align=right | 2.9 km || 
|-id=416 bgcolor=#E9E9E9
| 400416 ||  || — || October 3, 2006 || Mount Lemmon || Mount Lemmon Survey || — || align=right | 2.8 km || 
|-id=417 bgcolor=#E9E9E9
| 400417 ||  || — || February 6, 2008 || Catalina || CSS || EUN || align=right | 1.3 km || 
|-id=418 bgcolor=#E9E9E9
| 400418 ||  || — || February 7, 2008 || Kitt Peak || Spacewatch || — || align=right | 1.1 km || 
|-id=419 bgcolor=#E9E9E9
| 400419 ||  || — || February 7, 2008 || Mount Lemmon || Mount Lemmon Survey || — || align=right | 2.7 km || 
|-id=420 bgcolor=#E9E9E9
| 400420 ||  || — || February 9, 2008 || Kitt Peak || Spacewatch || AGN || align=right | 1.2 km || 
|-id=421 bgcolor=#d6d6d6
| 400421 ||  || — || February 9, 2008 || Catalina || CSS || — || align=right | 3.8 km || 
|-id=422 bgcolor=#E9E9E9
| 400422 ||  || — || February 9, 2008 || Mount Lemmon || Mount Lemmon Survey || AGN || align=right | 1.3 km || 
|-id=423 bgcolor=#fefefe
| 400423 ||  || — || January 11, 2008 || Catalina || CSS || H || align=right | 1.0 km || 
|-id=424 bgcolor=#d6d6d6
| 400424 ||  || — || February 8, 2008 || Kitt Peak || Spacewatch || TRE || align=right | 2.2 km || 
|-id=425 bgcolor=#d6d6d6
| 400425 ||  || — || January 30, 2008 || Mount Lemmon || Mount Lemmon Survey || — || align=right | 1.9 km || 
|-id=426 bgcolor=#E9E9E9
| 400426 ||  || — || February 9, 2008 || Kitt Peak || Spacewatch || EUN || align=right | 1.3 km || 
|-id=427 bgcolor=#E9E9E9
| 400427 ||  || — || February 9, 2008 || Kitt Peak || Spacewatch || — || align=right | 2.2 km || 
|-id=428 bgcolor=#E9E9E9
| 400428 ||  || — || February 10, 2008 || Kitt Peak || Spacewatch || — || align=right | 2.6 km || 
|-id=429 bgcolor=#E9E9E9
| 400429 ||  || — || January 11, 2008 || Socorro || LINEAR || — || align=right | 2.9 km || 
|-id=430 bgcolor=#d6d6d6
| 400430 ||  || — || February 9, 2008 || Socorro || LINEAR || — || align=right | 4.1 km || 
|-id=431 bgcolor=#d6d6d6
| 400431 ||  || — || February 7, 2008 || Mount Lemmon || Mount Lemmon Survey || — || align=right | 3.1 km || 
|-id=432 bgcolor=#E9E9E9
| 400432 ||  || — || February 11, 2008 || Kitt Peak || Spacewatch || — || align=right | 2.3 km || 
|-id=433 bgcolor=#E9E9E9
| 400433 ||  || — || February 24, 2008 || Mount Lemmon || Mount Lemmon Survey || — || align=right | 2.8 km || 
|-id=434 bgcolor=#d6d6d6
| 400434 ||  || — || February 24, 2008 || Bergisch Gladbach || W. Bickel || — || align=right | 3.2 km || 
|-id=435 bgcolor=#E9E9E9
| 400435 ||  || — || January 14, 2008 || Kitt Peak || Spacewatch || — || align=right | 3.5 km || 
|-id=436 bgcolor=#E9E9E9
| 400436 ||  || — || February 10, 2008 || Mount Lemmon || Mount Lemmon Survey || — || align=right | 2.3 km || 
|-id=437 bgcolor=#d6d6d6
| 400437 ||  || — || February 28, 2008 || Mount Lemmon || Mount Lemmon Survey || KOR || align=right | 1.6 km || 
|-id=438 bgcolor=#E9E9E9
| 400438 ||  || — || February 29, 2008 || Kitt Peak || Spacewatch || — || align=right | 2.6 km || 
|-id=439 bgcolor=#d6d6d6
| 400439 ||  || — || February 29, 2008 || Kitt Peak || Spacewatch || EUP || align=right | 3.3 km || 
|-id=440 bgcolor=#d6d6d6
| 400440 ||  || — || February 27, 2008 || Kitt Peak || Spacewatch || — || align=right | 2.6 km || 
|-id=441 bgcolor=#E9E9E9
| 400441 ||  || — || January 30, 2008 || Catalina || CSS || — || align=right | 2.8 km || 
|-id=442 bgcolor=#d6d6d6
| 400442 ||  || — || March 1, 2008 || Mount Lemmon || Mount Lemmon Survey || — || align=right | 2.7 km || 
|-id=443 bgcolor=#d6d6d6
| 400443 ||  || — || March 4, 2008 || Mount Lemmon || Mount Lemmon Survey || — || align=right | 2.7 km || 
|-id=444 bgcolor=#d6d6d6
| 400444 ||  || — || March 2, 2008 || Kitt Peak || Spacewatch || — || align=right | 2.8 km || 
|-id=445 bgcolor=#d6d6d6
| 400445 ||  || — || March 4, 2008 || Kitt Peak || Spacewatch || — || align=right | 3.0 km || 
|-id=446 bgcolor=#E9E9E9
| 400446 ||  || — || March 9, 2008 || Mount Lemmon || Mount Lemmon Survey || WIT || align=right data-sort-value="0.95" | 950 m || 
|-id=447 bgcolor=#E9E9E9
| 400447 ||  || — || March 16, 2004 || Kitt Peak || Spacewatch || — || align=right | 2.0 km || 
|-id=448 bgcolor=#d6d6d6
| 400448 ||  || — || March 11, 2008 || Kitt Peak || Spacewatch || — || align=right | 2.4 km || 
|-id=449 bgcolor=#d6d6d6
| 400449 ||  || — || February 28, 2008 || Kitt Peak || Spacewatch || — || align=right | 2.4 km || 
|-id=450 bgcolor=#d6d6d6
| 400450 ||  || — || March 1, 2008 || Kitt Peak || Spacewatch || — || align=right | 3.0 km || 
|-id=451 bgcolor=#d6d6d6
| 400451 ||  || — || March 10, 2008 || Mount Lemmon || Mount Lemmon Survey || — || align=right | 2.9 km || 
|-id=452 bgcolor=#d6d6d6
| 400452 ||  || — || March 5, 2008 || Kitt Peak || Spacewatch || — || align=right | 2.7 km || 
|-id=453 bgcolor=#d6d6d6
| 400453 ||  || — || March 13, 2008 || Kitt Peak || Spacewatch || — || align=right | 2.1 km || 
|-id=454 bgcolor=#d6d6d6
| 400454 ||  || — || March 27, 2008 || Kitt Peak || Spacewatch || — || align=right | 4.0 km || 
|-id=455 bgcolor=#d6d6d6
| 400455 ||  || — || March 12, 2008 || Mount Lemmon || Mount Lemmon Survey || — || align=right | 3.9 km || 
|-id=456 bgcolor=#d6d6d6
| 400456 ||  || — || February 27, 2008 || Mount Lemmon || Mount Lemmon Survey || EOS || align=right | 1.7 km || 
|-id=457 bgcolor=#d6d6d6
| 400457 ||  || — || March 28, 2008 || Kitt Peak || Spacewatch || — || align=right | 2.9 km || 
|-id=458 bgcolor=#d6d6d6
| 400458 ||  || — || March 10, 2008 || Kitt Peak || Spacewatch || THM || align=right | 2.0 km || 
|-id=459 bgcolor=#d6d6d6
| 400459 ||  || — || March 28, 2008 || Mount Lemmon || Mount Lemmon Survey || THM || align=right | 2.2 km || 
|-id=460 bgcolor=#d6d6d6
| 400460 ||  || — || March 28, 2008 || Mount Lemmon || Mount Lemmon Survey || — || align=right | 3.4 km || 
|-id=461 bgcolor=#d6d6d6
| 400461 ||  || — || March 29, 2008 || Catalina || CSS || — || align=right | 2.8 km || 
|-id=462 bgcolor=#d6d6d6
| 400462 ||  || — || March 31, 2008 || Kitt Peak || Spacewatch || — || align=right | 2.7 km || 
|-id=463 bgcolor=#d6d6d6
| 400463 ||  || — || March 15, 2008 || Kitt Peak || Spacewatch || KOR || align=right | 1.3 km || 
|-id=464 bgcolor=#d6d6d6
| 400464 ||  || — || March 28, 2008 || Mount Lemmon || Mount Lemmon Survey || EOS || align=right | 1.7 km || 
|-id=465 bgcolor=#d6d6d6
| 400465 ||  || — || March 30, 2008 || Kitt Peak || Spacewatch || — || align=right | 2.2 km || 
|-id=466 bgcolor=#d6d6d6
| 400466 ||  || — || April 7, 2008 || Grove Creek || F. Tozzi || Tj (2.94) || align=right | 3.8 km || 
|-id=467 bgcolor=#d6d6d6
| 400467 ||  || — || April 1, 2008 || Kitt Peak || Spacewatch || HYG || align=right | 2.6 km || 
|-id=468 bgcolor=#d6d6d6
| 400468 ||  || — || April 4, 2008 || Kitt Peak || Spacewatch || — || align=right | 2.6 km || 
|-id=469 bgcolor=#d6d6d6
| 400469 ||  || — || April 4, 2008 || Mount Lemmon || Mount Lemmon Survey || — || align=right | 4.2 km || 
|-id=470 bgcolor=#d6d6d6
| 400470 ||  || — || March 4, 2008 || Mount Lemmon || Mount Lemmon Survey || EOS || align=right | 2.0 km || 
|-id=471 bgcolor=#E9E9E9
| 400471 ||  || — || December 27, 2006 || Mount Lemmon || Mount Lemmon Survey || — || align=right | 1.9 km || 
|-id=472 bgcolor=#d6d6d6
| 400472 ||  || — || March 5, 2008 || Kitt Peak || Spacewatch || — || align=right | 2.7 km || 
|-id=473 bgcolor=#d6d6d6
| 400473 ||  || — || April 3, 2008 || Kitt Peak || Spacewatch || — || align=right | 2.5 km || 
|-id=474 bgcolor=#d6d6d6
| 400474 ||  || — || April 4, 2008 || Mount Lemmon || Mount Lemmon Survey || EOS || align=right | 1.6 km || 
|-id=475 bgcolor=#d6d6d6
| 400475 ||  || — || April 4, 2008 || Kitt Peak || Spacewatch || — || align=right | 4.2 km || 
|-id=476 bgcolor=#d6d6d6
| 400476 ||  || — || March 28, 2008 || Kitt Peak || Spacewatch || — || align=right | 3.3 km || 
|-id=477 bgcolor=#d6d6d6
| 400477 ||  || — || April 5, 2008 || Mount Lemmon || Mount Lemmon Survey || — || align=right | 2.4 km || 
|-id=478 bgcolor=#d6d6d6
| 400478 ||  || — || December 25, 2006 || Kitt Peak || Spacewatch || — || align=right | 2.6 km || 
|-id=479 bgcolor=#d6d6d6
| 400479 ||  || — || February 12, 2008 || Mount Lemmon || Mount Lemmon Survey || — || align=right | 2.9 km || 
|-id=480 bgcolor=#d6d6d6
| 400480 ||  || — || April 6, 2008 || Mount Lemmon || Mount Lemmon Survey || — || align=right | 3.2 km || 
|-id=481 bgcolor=#d6d6d6
| 400481 ||  || — || April 5, 2008 || Kitt Peak || Spacewatch || — || align=right | 3.0 km || 
|-id=482 bgcolor=#d6d6d6
| 400482 ||  || — || April 24, 2008 || Kitt Peak || Spacewatch || — || align=right | 2.6 km || 
|-id=483 bgcolor=#d6d6d6
| 400483 ||  || — || April 27, 2008 || Dauban || F. Kugel || — || align=right | 3.9 km || 
|-id=484 bgcolor=#d6d6d6
| 400484 ||  || — || April 24, 2008 || Kitt Peak || Spacewatch || — || align=right | 3.5 km || 
|-id=485 bgcolor=#d6d6d6
| 400485 ||  || — || April 11, 2008 || Mount Lemmon || Mount Lemmon Survey || — || align=right | 3.4 km || 
|-id=486 bgcolor=#d6d6d6
| 400486 ||  || — || May 1, 2003 || Kitt Peak || Spacewatch || — || align=right | 2.3 km || 
|-id=487 bgcolor=#d6d6d6
| 400487 ||  || — || April 3, 2008 || Mount Lemmon || Mount Lemmon Survey || EOS || align=right | 2.1 km || 
|-id=488 bgcolor=#d6d6d6
| 400488 ||  || — || April 27, 2008 || Kitt Peak || Spacewatch || — || align=right | 3.2 km || 
|-id=489 bgcolor=#d6d6d6
| 400489 ||  || — || April 30, 2008 || Kitt Peak || Spacewatch || EOS || align=right | 1.8 km || 
|-id=490 bgcolor=#d6d6d6
| 400490 ||  || — || February 24, 2008 || Mount Lemmon || Mount Lemmon Survey || — || align=right | 3.5 km || 
|-id=491 bgcolor=#d6d6d6
| 400491 ||  || — || May 1, 2008 || Kitt Peak || Spacewatch || — || align=right | 2.8 km || 
|-id=492 bgcolor=#d6d6d6
| 400492 ||  || — || May 1, 2008 || Kitt Peak || Spacewatch || — || align=right | 2.8 km || 
|-id=493 bgcolor=#d6d6d6
| 400493 ||  || — || May 3, 2008 || Mount Lemmon || Mount Lemmon Survey || — || align=right | 2.2 km || 
|-id=494 bgcolor=#d6d6d6
| 400494 ||  || — || May 2, 2008 || Kitt Peak || Spacewatch || URS || align=right | 3.0 km || 
|-id=495 bgcolor=#d6d6d6
| 400495 ||  || — || April 14, 2008 || Mount Lemmon || Mount Lemmon Survey || — || align=right | 3.1 km || 
|-id=496 bgcolor=#d6d6d6
| 400496 ||  || — || April 3, 2008 || Mount Lemmon || Mount Lemmon Survey || — || align=right | 3.5 km || 
|-id=497 bgcolor=#d6d6d6
| 400497 ||  || — || May 4, 2008 || Kitt Peak || Spacewatch || — || align=right | 4.1 km || 
|-id=498 bgcolor=#d6d6d6
| 400498 ||  || — || May 7, 2008 || Kitt Peak || Spacewatch || — || align=right | 4.2 km || 
|-id=499 bgcolor=#d6d6d6
| 400499 ||  || — || April 14, 2008 || Mount Lemmon || Mount Lemmon Survey || — || align=right | 3.8 km || 
|-id=500 bgcolor=#d6d6d6
| 400500 ||  || — || May 3, 2008 || Mount Lemmon || Mount Lemmon Survey || — || align=right | 3.2 km || 
|}

400501–400600 

|-bgcolor=#d6d6d6
| 400501 ||  || — || May 27, 2008 || Kitt Peak || Spacewatch || TIR || align=right | 3.0 km || 
|-id=502 bgcolor=#d6d6d6
| 400502 ||  || — || May 15, 2008 || Kitt Peak || Spacewatch || — || align=right | 3.5 km || 
|-id=503 bgcolor=#d6d6d6
| 400503 ||  || — || May 27, 2008 || Kitt Peak || Spacewatch || LIX || align=right | 3.4 km || 
|-id=504 bgcolor=#d6d6d6
| 400504 ||  || — || April 3, 2008 || Mount Lemmon || Mount Lemmon Survey || EUP || align=right | 3.3 km || 
|-id=505 bgcolor=#d6d6d6
| 400505 ||  || — || May 30, 2008 || Kitt Peak || Spacewatch || — || align=right | 2.7 km || 
|-id=506 bgcolor=#d6d6d6
| 400506 ||  || — || May 31, 2008 || Kitt Peak || Spacewatch || — || align=right | 2.6 km || 
|-id=507 bgcolor=#d6d6d6
| 400507 ||  || — || May 31, 2008 || Kitt Peak || Spacewatch || — || align=right | 3.1 km || 
|-id=508 bgcolor=#d6d6d6
| 400508 ||  || — || April 13, 2008 || Mount Lemmon || Mount Lemmon Survey || 7:4 || align=right | 3.1 km || 
|-id=509 bgcolor=#d6d6d6
| 400509 ||  || — || June 6, 2008 || Kitt Peak || Spacewatch || — || align=right | 3.4 km || 
|-id=510 bgcolor=#fefefe
| 400510 ||  || — || July 29, 2008 || La Sagra || OAM Obs. || — || align=right data-sort-value="0.64" | 640 m || 
|-id=511 bgcolor=#fefefe
| 400511 ||  || — || September 5, 2008 || Kitt Peak || Spacewatch || — || align=right data-sort-value="0.61" | 610 m || 
|-id=512 bgcolor=#fefefe
| 400512 ||  || — || September 7, 2008 || Mount Lemmon || Mount Lemmon Survey || — || align=right | 1.0 km || 
|-id=513 bgcolor=#FA8072
| 400513 ||  || — || September 25, 2005 || Kitt Peak || Spacewatch || — || align=right data-sort-value="0.77" | 770 m || 
|-id=514 bgcolor=#d6d6d6
| 400514 ||  || — || September 20, 2008 || Kitt Peak || Spacewatch || — || align=right | 2.7 km || 
|-id=515 bgcolor=#fefefe
| 400515 ||  || — || September 21, 2008 || Kitt Peak || Spacewatch || — || align=right data-sort-value="0.65" | 650 m || 
|-id=516 bgcolor=#fefefe
| 400516 ||  || — || September 4, 2008 || Kitt Peak || Spacewatch || — || align=right | 1.00 km || 
|-id=517 bgcolor=#fefefe
| 400517 ||  || — || September 22, 2008 || Mount Lemmon || Mount Lemmon Survey || — || align=right data-sort-value="0.60" | 600 m || 
|-id=518 bgcolor=#fefefe
| 400518 ||  || — || September 28, 2008 || Socorro || LINEAR || — || align=right data-sort-value="0.63" | 630 m || 
|-id=519 bgcolor=#d6d6d6
| 400519 ||  || — || September 25, 2008 || Kitt Peak || Spacewatch || 3:2 || align=right | 4.2 km || 
|-id=520 bgcolor=#fefefe
| 400520 ||  || — || September 25, 2008 || Mount Lemmon || Mount Lemmon Survey || (2076) || align=right data-sort-value="0.68" | 680 m || 
|-id=521 bgcolor=#d6d6d6
| 400521 ||  || — || September 29, 2008 || Catalina || CSS || EUP || align=right | 4.5 km || 
|-id=522 bgcolor=#fefefe
| 400522 ||  || — || September 29, 2008 || Kitt Peak || Spacewatch || — || align=right data-sort-value="0.72" | 720 m || 
|-id=523 bgcolor=#fefefe
| 400523 ||  || — || September 29, 2008 || Mount Lemmon || Mount Lemmon Survey || — || align=right data-sort-value="0.72" | 720 m || 
|-id=524 bgcolor=#fefefe
| 400524 ||  || — || September 22, 2008 || Kitt Peak || Spacewatch || V || align=right data-sort-value="0.88" | 880 m || 
|-id=525 bgcolor=#FA8072
| 400525 ||  || — || September 20, 2008 || Kitt Peak || Spacewatch || — || align=right data-sort-value="0.56" | 560 m || 
|-id=526 bgcolor=#fefefe
| 400526 ||  || — || September 24, 2008 || Mount Lemmon || Mount Lemmon Survey || — || align=right | 1.1 km || 
|-id=527 bgcolor=#fefefe
| 400527 ||  || — || September 22, 2008 || Mount Lemmon || Mount Lemmon Survey || — || align=right data-sort-value="0.58" | 580 m || 
|-id=528 bgcolor=#d6d6d6
| 400528 ||  || — || September 27, 2008 || Mount Lemmon || Mount Lemmon Survey || SHU3:2 || align=right | 6.1 km || 
|-id=529 bgcolor=#fefefe
| 400529 ||  || — || September 19, 2008 || Kitt Peak || Spacewatch || — || align=right data-sort-value="0.48" | 480 m || 
|-id=530 bgcolor=#fefefe
| 400530 ||  || — || October 2, 2008 || Kitt Peak || Spacewatch || — || align=right data-sort-value="0.67" | 670 m || 
|-id=531 bgcolor=#fefefe
| 400531 ||  || — || October 2, 2008 || Catalina || CSS || — || align=right data-sort-value="0.61" | 610 m || 
|-id=532 bgcolor=#fefefe
| 400532 ||  || — || October 20, 2008 || Kitt Peak || Spacewatch || — || align=right data-sort-value="0.98" | 980 m || 
|-id=533 bgcolor=#fefefe
| 400533 ||  || — || October 20, 2008 || Kitt Peak || Spacewatch || V || align=right data-sort-value="0.48" | 480 m || 
|-id=534 bgcolor=#fefefe
| 400534 ||  || — || October 21, 2008 || Kitt Peak || Spacewatch || — || align=right data-sort-value="0.76" | 760 m || 
|-id=535 bgcolor=#fefefe
| 400535 ||  || — || October 25, 2008 || Socorro || LINEAR || — || align=right | 2.6 km || 
|-id=536 bgcolor=#fefefe
| 400536 ||  || — || October 22, 2008 || Kitt Peak || Spacewatch || — || align=right data-sort-value="0.63" | 630 m || 
|-id=537 bgcolor=#fefefe
| 400537 ||  || — || October 22, 2008 || Kitt Peak || Spacewatch || — || align=right data-sort-value="0.55" | 550 m || 
|-id=538 bgcolor=#fefefe
| 400538 ||  || — || October 22, 2008 || Kitt Peak || Spacewatch || V || align=right data-sort-value="0.64" | 640 m || 
|-id=539 bgcolor=#fefefe
| 400539 ||  || — || September 22, 2008 || Mount Lemmon || Mount Lemmon Survey || — || align=right data-sort-value="0.98" | 980 m || 
|-id=540 bgcolor=#fefefe
| 400540 ||  || — || October 6, 2008 || Catalina || CSS || V || align=right data-sort-value="0.70" | 700 m || 
|-id=541 bgcolor=#fefefe
| 400541 ||  || — || October 24, 2008 || Catalina || CSS || — || align=right data-sort-value="0.89" | 890 m || 
|-id=542 bgcolor=#FA8072
| 400542 ||  || — || October 25, 2008 || Kitt Peak || Spacewatch || — || align=right data-sort-value="0.55" | 550 m || 
|-id=543 bgcolor=#fefefe
| 400543 ||  || — || October 10, 2001 || Kitt Peak || Spacewatch || — || align=right data-sort-value="0.70" | 700 m || 
|-id=544 bgcolor=#E9E9E9
| 400544 ||  || — || October 25, 2008 || Kitt Peak || Spacewatch || — || align=right | 3.3 km || 
|-id=545 bgcolor=#fefefe
| 400545 ||  || — || October 26, 2008 || Kitt Peak || Spacewatch || — || align=right data-sort-value="0.77" | 770 m || 
|-id=546 bgcolor=#fefefe
| 400546 ||  || — || September 23, 2008 || Mount Lemmon || Mount Lemmon Survey || V || align=right data-sort-value="0.71" | 710 m || 
|-id=547 bgcolor=#fefefe
| 400547 ||  || — || October 28, 2008 || Kitt Peak || Spacewatch || — || align=right data-sort-value="0.90" | 900 m || 
|-id=548 bgcolor=#fefefe
| 400548 ||  || — || September 25, 2008 || Kitt Peak || Spacewatch || — || align=right data-sort-value="0.70" | 700 m || 
|-id=549 bgcolor=#FA8072
| 400549 ||  || — || July 16, 2007 || Socorro || LINEAR || — || align=right | 1.2 km || 
|-id=550 bgcolor=#fefefe
| 400550 ||  || — || October 8, 2008 || Mount Lemmon || Mount Lemmon Survey || — || align=right data-sort-value="0.72" | 720 m || 
|-id=551 bgcolor=#fefefe
| 400551 ||  || — || October 25, 2008 || Mount Lemmon || Mount Lemmon Survey || — || align=right data-sort-value="0.88" | 880 m || 
|-id=552 bgcolor=#fefefe
| 400552 ||  || — || November 2, 2008 || Kitt Peak || Spacewatch || — || align=right | 1.1 km || 
|-id=553 bgcolor=#fefefe
| 400553 ||  || — || September 24, 2008 || Mount Lemmon || Mount Lemmon Survey || — || align=right data-sort-value="0.53" | 530 m || 
|-id=554 bgcolor=#fefefe
| 400554 ||  || — || November 6, 2008 || Catalina || CSS || — || align=right data-sort-value="0.71" | 710 m || 
|-id=555 bgcolor=#fefefe
| 400555 ||  || — || November 17, 2008 || Kitt Peak || Spacewatch || — || align=right data-sort-value="0.81" | 810 m || 
|-id=556 bgcolor=#fefefe
| 400556 ||  || — || November 3, 2008 || Mount Lemmon || Mount Lemmon Survey || — || align=right data-sort-value="0.60" | 600 m || 
|-id=557 bgcolor=#fefefe
| 400557 ||  || — || November 17, 2008 || Kitt Peak || Spacewatch || — || align=right data-sort-value="0.89" | 890 m || 
|-id=558 bgcolor=#fefefe
| 400558 ||  || — || October 21, 2008 || Mount Lemmon || Mount Lemmon Survey || — || align=right data-sort-value="0.96" | 960 m || 
|-id=559 bgcolor=#FA8072
| 400559 ||  || — || November 18, 2008 || Kitt Peak || Spacewatch || PHO || align=right data-sort-value="0.98" | 980 m || 
|-id=560 bgcolor=#fefefe
| 400560 ||  || — || November 18, 2008 || Kitt Peak || Spacewatch || — || align=right data-sort-value="0.87" | 870 m || 
|-id=561 bgcolor=#E9E9E9
| 400561 ||  || — || November 20, 2008 || Kitt Peak || Spacewatch || — || align=right data-sort-value="0.89" | 890 m || 
|-id=562 bgcolor=#fefefe
| 400562 ||  || — || November 30, 2008 || Catalina || CSS || — || align=right | 2.8 km || 
|-id=563 bgcolor=#fefefe
| 400563 ||  || — || November 30, 2008 || Kitt Peak || Spacewatch || — || align=right data-sort-value="0.71" | 710 m || 
|-id=564 bgcolor=#fefefe
| 400564 ||  || — || November 20, 2008 || Kitt Peak || Spacewatch || — || align=right | 1.0 km || 
|-id=565 bgcolor=#d6d6d6
| 400565 ||  || — || November 19, 2008 || Mount Lemmon || Mount Lemmon Survey || — || align=right | 2.4 km || 
|-id=566 bgcolor=#fefefe
| 400566 ||  || — || November 19, 2008 || Mount Lemmon || Mount Lemmon Survey || — || align=right data-sort-value="0.90" | 900 m || 
|-id=567 bgcolor=#fefefe
| 400567 ||  || — || October 29, 2008 || Kitt Peak || Spacewatch || — || align=right data-sort-value="0.73" | 730 m || 
|-id=568 bgcolor=#fefefe
| 400568 ||  || — || November 24, 2008 || Kitt Peak || Spacewatch || — || align=right data-sort-value="0.98" | 980 m || 
|-id=569 bgcolor=#fefefe
| 400569 ||  || — || December 3, 2008 || Mount Lemmon || Mount Lemmon Survey || V || align=right data-sort-value="0.76" | 760 m || 
|-id=570 bgcolor=#E9E9E9
| 400570 ||  || — || December 7, 2008 || Mount Lemmon || Mount Lemmon Survey || — || align=right data-sort-value="0.98" | 980 m || 
|-id=571 bgcolor=#fefefe
| 400571 ||  || — || December 4, 2008 || Kitt Peak || Spacewatch || — || align=right data-sort-value="0.92" | 920 m || 
|-id=572 bgcolor=#E9E9E9
| 400572 ||  || — || December 21, 2008 || Mount Lemmon || Mount Lemmon Survey || — || align=right data-sort-value="0.92" | 920 m || 
|-id=573 bgcolor=#fefefe
| 400573 ||  || — || December 20, 2008 || Lulin || LUSS || V || align=right data-sort-value="0.97" | 970 m || 
|-id=574 bgcolor=#fefefe
| 400574 ||  || — || December 21, 2008 || Mount Lemmon || Mount Lemmon Survey || — || align=right data-sort-value="0.81" | 810 m || 
|-id=575 bgcolor=#fefefe
| 400575 ||  || — || December 21, 2008 || Mount Lemmon || Mount Lemmon Survey || — || align=right data-sort-value="0.75" | 750 m || 
|-id=576 bgcolor=#fefefe
| 400576 ||  || — || December 22, 2008 || Kitt Peak || Spacewatch || — || align=right data-sort-value="0.62" | 620 m || 
|-id=577 bgcolor=#fefefe
| 400577 ||  || — || December 4, 2008 || Mount Lemmon || Mount Lemmon Survey || — || align=right data-sort-value="0.75" | 750 m || 
|-id=578 bgcolor=#fefefe
| 400578 ||  || — || December 29, 2008 || Kitt Peak || Spacewatch || V || align=right data-sort-value="0.71" | 710 m || 
|-id=579 bgcolor=#fefefe
| 400579 ||  || — || December 3, 2008 || Mount Lemmon || Mount Lemmon Survey || V || align=right data-sort-value="0.66" | 660 m || 
|-id=580 bgcolor=#fefefe
| 400580 ||  || — || December 30, 2008 || Mount Lemmon || Mount Lemmon Survey || — || align=right | 1.1 km || 
|-id=581 bgcolor=#fefefe
| 400581 ||  || — || December 30, 2008 || Mount Lemmon || Mount Lemmon Survey || — || align=right data-sort-value="0.66" | 660 m || 
|-id=582 bgcolor=#fefefe
| 400582 ||  || — || December 29, 2008 || Kitt Peak || Spacewatch || — || align=right data-sort-value="0.98" | 980 m || 
|-id=583 bgcolor=#fefefe
| 400583 ||  || — || December 29, 2008 || Kitt Peak || Spacewatch || MAS || align=right data-sort-value="0.77" | 770 m || 
|-id=584 bgcolor=#fefefe
| 400584 ||  || — || December 29, 2008 || Kitt Peak || Spacewatch || — || align=right data-sort-value="0.85" | 850 m || 
|-id=585 bgcolor=#fefefe
| 400585 ||  || — || December 30, 2008 || Kitt Peak || Spacewatch || — || align=right data-sort-value="0.69" | 690 m || 
|-id=586 bgcolor=#fefefe
| 400586 ||  || — || December 22, 2008 || Kitt Peak || Spacewatch || — || align=right data-sort-value="0.65" | 650 m || 
|-id=587 bgcolor=#fefefe
| 400587 ||  || — || December 30, 2008 || Kitt Peak || Spacewatch || — || align=right | 1.0 km || 
|-id=588 bgcolor=#fefefe
| 400588 ||  || — || December 21, 2008 || Kitt Peak || Spacewatch || — || align=right | 1.3 km || 
|-id=589 bgcolor=#fefefe
| 400589 ||  || — || December 30, 2008 || Catalina || CSS || — || align=right | 1.3 km || 
|-id=590 bgcolor=#E9E9E9
| 400590 ||  || — || December 22, 2008 || Catalina || CSS || — || align=right | 1.7 km || 
|-id=591 bgcolor=#d6d6d6
| 400591 ||  || — || January 1, 2009 || Mount Lemmon || Mount Lemmon Survey || 3:2 || align=right | 5.7 km || 
|-id=592 bgcolor=#fefefe
| 400592 ||  || — || January 2, 2009 || Mount Lemmon || Mount Lemmon Survey || — || align=right data-sort-value="0.62" | 620 m || 
|-id=593 bgcolor=#fefefe
| 400593 ||  || — || December 4, 2008 || Mount Lemmon || Mount Lemmon Survey || V || align=right data-sort-value="0.71" | 710 m || 
|-id=594 bgcolor=#fefefe
| 400594 ||  || — || January 15, 2009 || Kitt Peak || Spacewatch || — || align=right | 1.0 km || 
|-id=595 bgcolor=#fefefe
| 400595 ||  || — || November 20, 2008 || Mount Lemmon || Mount Lemmon Survey || — || align=right | 1.0 km || 
|-id=596 bgcolor=#FA8072
| 400596 ||  || — || January 18, 2009 || Catalina || CSS || — || align=right | 2.5 km || 
|-id=597 bgcolor=#fefefe
| 400597 ||  || — || January 18, 2009 || Kitt Peak || Spacewatch || — || align=right | 1.3 km || 
|-id=598 bgcolor=#fefefe
| 400598 ||  || — || January 16, 2009 || Mount Lemmon || Mount Lemmon Survey || — || align=right data-sort-value="0.71" | 710 m || 
|-id=599 bgcolor=#E9E9E9
| 400599 ||  || — || January 17, 2009 || Mount Lemmon || Mount Lemmon Survey || — || align=right | 1.0 km || 
|-id=600 bgcolor=#E9E9E9
| 400600 ||  || — || January 20, 2009 || Kitt Peak || Spacewatch || (5) || align=right data-sort-value="0.85" | 850 m || 
|}

400601–400700 

|-bgcolor=#fefefe
| 400601 ||  || — || December 29, 2008 || Mount Lemmon || Mount Lemmon Survey || — || align=right | 1.0 km || 
|-id=602 bgcolor=#fefefe
| 400602 ||  || — || November 9, 2004 || Catalina || CSS || — || align=right data-sort-value="0.89" | 890 m || 
|-id=603 bgcolor=#E9E9E9
| 400603 ||  || — || January 28, 2009 || Catalina || CSS || — || align=right | 3.8 km || 
|-id=604 bgcolor=#E9E9E9
| 400604 ||  || — || January 31, 2009 || Kitt Peak || Spacewatch || — || align=right | 2.2 km || 
|-id=605 bgcolor=#fefefe
| 400605 ||  || — || January 31, 2009 || Kitt Peak || Spacewatch || V || align=right data-sort-value="0.68" | 680 m || 
|-id=606 bgcolor=#fefefe
| 400606 ||  || — || January 30, 2009 || Mount Lemmon || Mount Lemmon Survey || — || align=right data-sort-value="0.83" | 830 m || 
|-id=607 bgcolor=#fefefe
| 400607 ||  || — || January 30, 2009 || Mount Lemmon || Mount Lemmon Survey || — || align=right data-sort-value="0.98" | 980 m || 
|-id=608 bgcolor=#E9E9E9
| 400608 ||  || — || January 31, 2009 || Kitt Peak || Spacewatch || AGN || align=right | 1.5 km || 
|-id=609 bgcolor=#E9E9E9
| 400609 ||  || — || January 17, 2009 || Kitt Peak || Spacewatch || — || align=right | 2.1 km || 
|-id=610 bgcolor=#E9E9E9
| 400610 ||  || — || January 17, 2009 || Kitt Peak || Spacewatch ||  || align=right | 2.0 km || 
|-id=611 bgcolor=#E9E9E9
| 400611 ||  || — || January 18, 2009 || Catalina || CSS || — || align=right | 3.4 km || 
|-id=612 bgcolor=#E9E9E9
| 400612 ||  || — || January 20, 2009 || Mount Lemmon || Mount Lemmon Survey || — || align=right | 2.6 km || 
|-id=613 bgcolor=#d6d6d6
| 400613 ||  || — || February 3, 2009 || Mount Lemmon || Mount Lemmon Survey || — || align=right | 4.3 km || 
|-id=614 bgcolor=#E9E9E9
| 400614 ||  || — || February 9, 2005 || Kitt Peak || Spacewatch || — || align=right | 1.1 km || 
|-id=615 bgcolor=#fefefe
| 400615 ||  || — || September 9, 2007 || Kitt Peak || Spacewatch || — || align=right data-sort-value="0.94" | 940 m || 
|-id=616 bgcolor=#E9E9E9
| 400616 ||  || — || February 2, 2009 || Mount Lemmon || Mount Lemmon Survey || — || align=right | 1.1 km || 
|-id=617 bgcolor=#fefefe
| 400617 ||  || — || February 1, 2009 || Kitt Peak || Spacewatch || — || align=right data-sort-value="0.90" | 900 m || 
|-id=618 bgcolor=#E9E9E9
| 400618 ||  || — || February 1, 2009 || Great Shefford || P. Birtwhistle || — || align=right | 1.4 km || 
|-id=619 bgcolor=#E9E9E9
| 400619 ||  || — || November 8, 2008 || Kitt Peak || Spacewatch || — || align=right | 1.5 km || 
|-id=620 bgcolor=#fefefe
| 400620 ||  || — || February 14, 2009 || Mount Lemmon || Mount Lemmon Survey || — || align=right | 1.0 km || 
|-id=621 bgcolor=#E9E9E9
| 400621 ||  || — || February 19, 2009 || Kitt Peak || Spacewatch || JUN || align=right | 1.1 km || 
|-id=622 bgcolor=#E9E9E9
| 400622 ||  || — || February 20, 2009 || Kitt Peak || Spacewatch ||  || align=right | 1.6 km || 
|-id=623 bgcolor=#E9E9E9
| 400623 ||  || — || November 30, 2008 || Mount Lemmon || Mount Lemmon Survey || — || align=right | 1.3 km || 
|-id=624 bgcolor=#E9E9E9
| 400624 ||  || — || February 22, 2009 || Kitt Peak || Spacewatch || — || align=right | 1.7 km || 
|-id=625 bgcolor=#fefefe
| 400625 ||  || — || November 9, 2007 || Kitt Peak || Spacewatch || — || align=right | 1.0 km || 
|-id=626 bgcolor=#E9E9E9
| 400626 ||  || — || January 17, 2009 || Mount Lemmon || Mount Lemmon Survey || — || align=right data-sort-value="0.84" | 840 m || 
|-id=627 bgcolor=#E9E9E9
| 400627 ||  || — || February 26, 2009 || Kitt Peak || Spacewatch || — || align=right data-sort-value="0.91" | 910 m || 
|-id=628 bgcolor=#fefefe
| 400628 ||  || — || February 4, 2009 || Mount Lemmon || Mount Lemmon Survey || — || align=right | 1.0 km || 
|-id=629 bgcolor=#E9E9E9
| 400629 ||  || — || January 31, 2009 || Mount Lemmon || Mount Lemmon Survey || — || align=right | 2.2 km || 
|-id=630 bgcolor=#E9E9E9
| 400630 ||  || — || February 27, 2009 || Kitt Peak || Spacewatch || — || align=right | 2.3 km || 
|-id=631 bgcolor=#E9E9E9
| 400631 ||  || — || February 19, 2009 || Kitt Peak || Spacewatch || — || align=right | 1.6 km || 
|-id=632 bgcolor=#E9E9E9
| 400632 ||  || — || February 27, 2009 || Kitt Peak || Spacewatch || — || align=right | 1.6 km || 
|-id=633 bgcolor=#E9E9E9
| 400633 ||  || — || February 25, 2009 || Črni Vrh || Črni Vrh || — || align=right | 1.1 km || 
|-id=634 bgcolor=#fefefe
| 400634 ||  || — || January 27, 2009 || XuYi || PMO NEO || — || align=right | 1.2 km || 
|-id=635 bgcolor=#E9E9E9
| 400635 ||  || — || February 24, 2009 || Catalina || CSS || — || align=right | 1.7 km || 
|-id=636 bgcolor=#E9E9E9
| 400636 ||  || — || March 5, 2009 || Cerro Burek || Alianza S4 Obs. || EUN || align=right | 1.4 km || 
|-id=637 bgcolor=#E9E9E9
| 400637 ||  || — || March 1, 2009 || Kitt Peak || Spacewatch || — || align=right | 2.8 km || 
|-id=638 bgcolor=#E9E9E9
| 400638 ||  || — || March 1, 2009 || Mount Lemmon || Mount Lemmon Survey || KON || align=right | 2.8 km || 
|-id=639 bgcolor=#E9E9E9
| 400639 ||  || — || January 31, 2009 || Mount Lemmon || Mount Lemmon Survey || — || align=right | 1.6 km || 
|-id=640 bgcolor=#E9E9E9
| 400640 ||  || — || March 15, 2009 || La Sagra || OAM Obs. || — || align=right | 2.2 km || 
|-id=641 bgcolor=#E9E9E9
| 400641 ||  || — || February 20, 2009 || Kitt Peak || Spacewatch || — || align=right | 1.2 km || 
|-id=642 bgcolor=#E9E9E9
| 400642 ||  || — || January 31, 2009 || Mount Lemmon || Mount Lemmon Survey || — || align=right | 1.4 km || 
|-id=643 bgcolor=#E9E9E9
| 400643 ||  || — || March 19, 2009 || Catalina || CSS || EUN || align=right | 1.3 km || 
|-id=644 bgcolor=#E9E9E9
| 400644 ||  || — || March 2, 2009 || Mount Lemmon || Mount Lemmon Survey || — || align=right | 1.6 km || 
|-id=645 bgcolor=#E9E9E9
| 400645 ||  || — || March 29, 2009 || Mount Lemmon || Mount Lemmon Survey || — || align=right | 2.1 km || 
|-id=646 bgcolor=#E9E9E9
| 400646 ||  || — || March 28, 2009 || Kitt Peak || Spacewatch || — || align=right | 1.3 km || 
|-id=647 bgcolor=#d6d6d6
| 400647 ||  || — || March 21, 2009 || Mount Lemmon || Mount Lemmon Survey || — || align=right | 2.0 km || 
|-id=648 bgcolor=#E9E9E9
| 400648 ||  || — || February 19, 2009 || Kitt Peak || Spacewatch || — || align=right data-sort-value="0.92" | 920 m || 
|-id=649 bgcolor=#E9E9E9
| 400649 ||  || — || March 19, 2009 || Kitt Peak || Spacewatch || — || align=right | 1.8 km || 
|-id=650 bgcolor=#E9E9E9
| 400650 ||  || — || April 18, 2009 || Kitt Peak || Spacewatch || JUN || align=right data-sort-value="0.87" | 870 m || 
|-id=651 bgcolor=#E9E9E9
| 400651 ||  || — || April 19, 2009 || Kitt Peak || Spacewatch || — || align=right | 1.8 km || 
|-id=652 bgcolor=#E9E9E9
| 400652 ||  || — || April 17, 2009 || Kitt Peak || Spacewatch || — || align=right | 2.3 km || 
|-id=653 bgcolor=#E9E9E9
| 400653 ||  || — || March 31, 2009 || Kitt Peak || Spacewatch || — || align=right | 2.3 km || 
|-id=654 bgcolor=#E9E9E9
| 400654 ||  || — || April 19, 2009 || Kitt Peak || Spacewatch || — || align=right | 2.1 km || 
|-id=655 bgcolor=#E9E9E9
| 400655 ||  || — || March 26, 2009 || Mount Lemmon || Mount Lemmon Survey || — || align=right | 2.6 km || 
|-id=656 bgcolor=#E9E9E9
| 400656 ||  || — || September 14, 2006 || Kitt Peak || Spacewatch || — || align=right | 2.2 km || 
|-id=657 bgcolor=#E9E9E9
| 400657 ||  || — || April 20, 2009 || Kitt Peak || Spacewatch || — || align=right | 1.8 km || 
|-id=658 bgcolor=#E9E9E9
| 400658 ||  || — || March 31, 2009 || Kitt Peak || Spacewatch || — || align=right | 1.9 km || 
|-id=659 bgcolor=#E9E9E9
| 400659 ||  || — || February 25, 2009 || Siding Spring || SSS || — || align=right | 2.2 km || 
|-id=660 bgcolor=#E9E9E9
| 400660 ||  || — || April 23, 2009 || Kitt Peak || Spacewatch || — || align=right | 1.8 km || 
|-id=661 bgcolor=#E9E9E9
| 400661 ||  || — || April 30, 2009 || La Sagra || OAM Obs. || — || align=right | 2.1 km || 
|-id=662 bgcolor=#E9E9E9
| 400662 ||  || — || October 27, 2006 || Mount Lemmon || Mount Lemmon Survey || — || align=right | 2.0 km || 
|-id=663 bgcolor=#E9E9E9
| 400663 ||  || — || April 20, 2009 || Kitt Peak || Spacewatch || — || align=right | 1.9 km || 
|-id=664 bgcolor=#E9E9E9
| 400664 ||  || — || April 22, 2009 || Mount Lemmon || Mount Lemmon Survey || — || align=right | 2.4 km || 
|-id=665 bgcolor=#E9E9E9
| 400665 ||  || — || September 18, 2006 || Kitt Peak || Spacewatch || — || align=right | 1.5 km || 
|-id=666 bgcolor=#d6d6d6
| 400666 ||  || — || April 23, 2009 || Kitt Peak || Spacewatch || — || align=right | 2.5 km || 
|-id=667 bgcolor=#E9E9E9
| 400667 ||  || — || March 30, 2009 || Mount Lemmon || Mount Lemmon Survey || EUN || align=right | 1.4 km || 
|-id=668 bgcolor=#fefefe
| 400668 ||  || — || May 29, 2009 || Mount Lemmon || Mount Lemmon Survey || H || align=right data-sort-value="0.65" | 650 m || 
|-id=669 bgcolor=#E9E9E9
| 400669 ||  || — || June 12, 2009 || Catalina || CSS || — || align=right | 2.3 km || 
|-id=670 bgcolor=#fefefe
| 400670 ||  || — || June 27, 2009 || La Sagra || OAM Obs. || H || align=right data-sort-value="0.94" | 940 m || 
|-id=671 bgcolor=#d6d6d6
| 400671 ||  || — || June 28, 2009 || Haleakala || Pan-STARRS || — || align=right | 2.5 km || 
|-id=672 bgcolor=#d6d6d6
| 400672 ||  || — || May 28, 2009 || Kitt Peak || Spacewatch || — || align=right | 3.9 km || 
|-id=673 bgcolor=#d6d6d6
| 400673 Vitapolunina ||  ||  || July 24, 2009 || Zelenchukskaya || T. V. Kryachko || — || align=right | 2.7 km || 
|-id=674 bgcolor=#d6d6d6
| 400674 ||  || — || July 30, 2009 || Tzec Maun || F. Tozzi || — || align=right | 3.9 km || 
|-id=675 bgcolor=#d6d6d6
| 400675 ||  || — || July 29, 2009 || Cerro Burek || Alianza S4 Obs. || — || align=right | 3.5 km || 
|-id=676 bgcolor=#d6d6d6
| 400676 ||  || — || July 27, 2009 || Catalina || CSS || THB || align=right | 3.4 km || 
|-id=677 bgcolor=#d6d6d6
| 400677 ||  || — || August 2, 2009 || La Sagra || OAM Obs. || — || align=right | 3.4 km || 
|-id=678 bgcolor=#d6d6d6
| 400678 ||  || — || August 15, 2009 || La Sagra || OAM Obs. || — || align=right | 3.9 km || 
|-id=679 bgcolor=#d6d6d6
| 400679 ||  || — || July 29, 2009 || Kitt Peak || Spacewatch || — || align=right | 4.1 km || 
|-id=680 bgcolor=#fefefe
| 400680 ||  || — || August 15, 2009 || Kitt Peak || Spacewatch || H || align=right data-sort-value="0.83" | 830 m || 
|-id=681 bgcolor=#d6d6d6
| 400681 ||  || — || August 15, 2009 || Catalina || CSS || — || align=right | 3.6 km || 
|-id=682 bgcolor=#d6d6d6
| 400682 ||  || — || August 15, 2009 || Kitt Peak || Spacewatch || — || align=right | 3.0 km || 
|-id=683 bgcolor=#d6d6d6
| 400683 ||  || — || August 15, 2009 || Kitt Peak || Spacewatch || — || align=right | 2.5 km || 
|-id=684 bgcolor=#FA8072
| 400684 ||  || — || August 17, 2009 || Catalina || CSS || — || align=right | 2.7 km || 
|-id=685 bgcolor=#d6d6d6
| 400685 ||  || — || August 16, 2009 || Kitt Peak || Spacewatch || — || align=right | 2.9 km || 
|-id=686 bgcolor=#d6d6d6
| 400686 ||  || — || August 21, 2009 || Socorro || LINEAR || — || align=right | 3.9 km || 
|-id=687 bgcolor=#d6d6d6
| 400687 ||  || — || August 17, 2009 || Kitt Peak || Spacewatch || EOS || align=right | 2.6 km || 
|-id=688 bgcolor=#d6d6d6
| 400688 ||  || — || August 28, 2009 || La Sagra || OAM Obs. || — || align=right | 4.6 km || 
|-id=689 bgcolor=#d6d6d6
| 400689 ||  || — || August 31, 2009 || La Sagra || OAM Obs. || EUP || align=right | 4.5 km || 
|-id=690 bgcolor=#d6d6d6
| 400690 ||  || — || August 27, 2009 || La Sagra || OAM Obs. || — || align=right | 2.2 km || 
|-id=691 bgcolor=#d6d6d6
| 400691 ||  || — || August 27, 2009 || Catalina || CSS || — || align=right | 3.1 km || 
|-id=692 bgcolor=#d6d6d6
| 400692 ||  || — || August 27, 2009 || Kitt Peak || Spacewatch || — || align=right | 2.4 km || 
|-id=693 bgcolor=#d6d6d6
| 400693 ||  || — || August 17, 2009 || Kitt Peak || Spacewatch || — || align=right | 3.0 km || 
|-id=694 bgcolor=#d6d6d6
| 400694 ||  || — || August 17, 2009 || Bergisch Gladbac || W. Bickel || TIR || align=right | 2.6 km || 
|-id=695 bgcolor=#d6d6d6
| 400695 ||  || — || August 21, 2009 || Socorro || LINEAR || TIR || align=right | 3.0 km || 
|-id=696 bgcolor=#d6d6d6
| 400696 ||  || — || August 28, 2009 || Socorro || LINEAR || — || align=right | 3.6 km || 
|-id=697 bgcolor=#d6d6d6
| 400697 ||  || — || September 15, 2009 || Tzec Maun || L. Elenin || — || align=right | 3.4 km || 
|-id=698 bgcolor=#d6d6d6
| 400698 ||  || — || September 10, 2009 || Catalina || CSS || — || align=right | 3.4 km || 
|-id=699 bgcolor=#d6d6d6
| 400699 ||  || — || September 12, 2009 || Kitt Peak || Spacewatch || — || align=right | 2.9 km || 
|-id=700 bgcolor=#d6d6d6
| 400700 ||  || — || September 12, 2009 || Kitt Peak || Spacewatch || THM || align=right | 2.0 km || 
|}

400701–400800 

|-bgcolor=#d6d6d6
| 400701 ||  || — || September 12, 2009 || Kitt Peak || Spacewatch || — || align=right | 3.0 km || 
|-id=702 bgcolor=#d6d6d6
| 400702 ||  || — || September 12, 2009 || Kitt Peak || Spacewatch || — || align=right | 3.1 km || 
|-id=703 bgcolor=#d6d6d6
| 400703 ||  || — || September 12, 2009 || Kitt Peak || Spacewatch || — || align=right | 3.1 km || 
|-id=704 bgcolor=#d6d6d6
| 400704 ||  || — || September 14, 2009 || Catalina || CSS || — || align=right | 4.2 km || 
|-id=705 bgcolor=#d6d6d6
| 400705 ||  || — || September 14, 2009 || Catalina || CSS || — || align=right | 3.9 km || 
|-id=706 bgcolor=#d6d6d6
| 400706 ||  || — || September 14, 2009 || Kitt Peak || Spacewatch || — || align=right | 2.9 km || 
|-id=707 bgcolor=#d6d6d6
| 400707 ||  || — || September 15, 2009 || Kitt Peak || Spacewatch || EOS || align=right | 2.4 km || 
|-id=708 bgcolor=#d6d6d6
| 400708 ||  || — || September 15, 2009 || Kitt Peak || Spacewatch || THM || align=right | 2.5 km || 
|-id=709 bgcolor=#d6d6d6
| 400709 ||  || — || June 21, 2009 || Mount Lemmon || Mount Lemmon Survey || — || align=right | 5.0 km || 
|-id=710 bgcolor=#d6d6d6
| 400710 ||  || — || September 15, 2009 || Kitt Peak || Spacewatch || THM || align=right | 2.3 km || 
|-id=711 bgcolor=#d6d6d6
| 400711 ||  || — || September 15, 2009 || Catalina || CSS || Tj (2.99) || align=right | 4.1 km || 
|-id=712 bgcolor=#d6d6d6
| 400712 ||  || — || September 17, 2009 || Bisei SG Center || BATTeRS || — || align=right | 2.8 km || 
|-id=713 bgcolor=#d6d6d6
| 400713 ||  || — || September 16, 2009 || Kitt Peak || Spacewatch || — || align=right | 3.1 km || 
|-id=714 bgcolor=#d6d6d6
| 400714 ||  || — || October 14, 1998 || Kitt Peak || Spacewatch || VER || align=right | 3.1 km || 
|-id=715 bgcolor=#d6d6d6
| 400715 ||  || — || August 15, 2009 || Kitt Peak || Spacewatch || — || align=right | 2.5 km || 
|-id=716 bgcolor=#d6d6d6
| 400716 ||  || — || September 20, 2009 || Catalina || CSS || — || align=right | 6.3 km || 
|-id=717 bgcolor=#d6d6d6
| 400717 ||  || — || September 17, 2009 || Catalina || CSS || — || align=right | 3.1 km || 
|-id=718 bgcolor=#d6d6d6
| 400718 ||  || — || September 17, 2009 || Mount Lemmon || Mount Lemmon Survey || — || align=right | 2.9 km || 
|-id=719 bgcolor=#d6d6d6
| 400719 ||  || — || September 17, 2009 || Mount Lemmon || Mount Lemmon Survey || — || align=right | 2.2 km || 
|-id=720 bgcolor=#d6d6d6
| 400720 ||  || — || August 27, 2009 || Kitt Peak || Spacewatch || EOS || align=right | 2.0 km || 
|-id=721 bgcolor=#d6d6d6
| 400721 ||  || — || September 18, 2009 || Mount Lemmon || Mount Lemmon Survey || — || align=right | 2.9 km || 
|-id=722 bgcolor=#d6d6d6
| 400722 ||  || — || November 20, 2004 || Campo Imperatore || CINEOS || VER || align=right | 3.6 km || 
|-id=723 bgcolor=#d6d6d6
| 400723 ||  || — || September 16, 2009 || Mount Lemmon || Mount Lemmon Survey || — || align=right | 3.9 km || 
|-id=724 bgcolor=#d6d6d6
| 400724 ||  || — || September 12, 2009 || Kitt Peak || Spacewatch || THM || align=right | 2.3 km || 
|-id=725 bgcolor=#d6d6d6
| 400725 ||  || — || September 21, 2009 || Mount Lemmon || Mount Lemmon Survey || — || align=right | 3.2 km || 
|-id=726 bgcolor=#d6d6d6
| 400726 ||  || — || September 28, 2009 || Nogales || Tenagra II Obs. || Tj (2.98) || align=right | 5.4 km || 
|-id=727 bgcolor=#d6d6d6
| 400727 ||  || — || August 29, 2009 || Kitt Peak || Spacewatch || — || align=right | 3.3 km || 
|-id=728 bgcolor=#d6d6d6
| 400728 ||  || — || September 22, 2009 || Kitt Peak || Spacewatch || THM || align=right | 2.2 km || 
|-id=729 bgcolor=#d6d6d6
| 400729 ||  || — || September 29, 2009 || Tzec Maun || F. Tozzi || — || align=right | 4.0 km || 
|-id=730 bgcolor=#d6d6d6
| 400730 ||  || — || September 24, 2009 || Kitt Peak || Spacewatch || — || align=right | 2.3 km || 
|-id=731 bgcolor=#d6d6d6
| 400731 ||  || — || August 18, 2009 || Kitt Peak || Spacewatch || — || align=right | 3.2 km || 
|-id=732 bgcolor=#d6d6d6
| 400732 ||  || — || September 20, 2009 || Mount Lemmon || Mount Lemmon Survey || — || align=right | 3.2 km || 
|-id=733 bgcolor=#d6d6d6
| 400733 ||  || — || September 18, 2009 || Catalina || CSS || TIR || align=right | 4.0 km || 
|-id=734 bgcolor=#d6d6d6
| 400734 ||  || — || September 18, 2009 || Catalina || CSS || — || align=right | 3.1 km || 
|-id=735 bgcolor=#d6d6d6
| 400735 ||  || — || September 27, 2009 || Catalina || CSS || — || align=right | 2.6 km || 
|-id=736 bgcolor=#d6d6d6
| 400736 ||  || — || September 19, 2009 || Moletai || K. Černis, J. Zdanavičius || — || align=right | 2.6 km || 
|-id=737 bgcolor=#d6d6d6
| 400737 ||  || — || October 15, 2009 || Catalina || CSS || — || align=right | 3.4 km || 
|-id=738 bgcolor=#d6d6d6
| 400738 ||  || — || October 15, 2009 || Catalina || CSS || — || align=right | 3.9 km || 
|-id=739 bgcolor=#d6d6d6
| 400739 ||  || — || October 18, 2009 || Nazaret || G. Muler || — || align=right | 3.0 km || 
|-id=740 bgcolor=#d6d6d6
| 400740 ||  || — || October 22, 2009 || Mount Lemmon || Mount Lemmon Survey || — || align=right | 3.9 km || 
|-id=741 bgcolor=#d6d6d6
| 400741 ||  || — || February 24, 2006 || Kitt Peak || Spacewatch || — || align=right | 3.1 km || 
|-id=742 bgcolor=#d6d6d6
| 400742 ||  || — || October 16, 2009 || Catalina || CSS || — || align=right | 4.1 km || 
|-id=743 bgcolor=#d6d6d6
| 400743 ||  || — || October 26, 2009 || Catalina || CSS || EMA || align=right | 4.0 km || 
|-id=744 bgcolor=#d6d6d6
| 400744 ||  || — || October 27, 2009 || La Sagra || OAM Obs. || — || align=right | 4.3 km || 
|-id=745 bgcolor=#d6d6d6
| 400745 ||  || — || October 26, 2009 || Mount Lemmon || Mount Lemmon Survey || — || align=right | 3.6 km || 
|-id=746 bgcolor=#d6d6d6
| 400746 ||  || — || October 27, 2009 || Mount Lemmon || Mount Lemmon Survey || — || align=right | 4.6 km || 
|-id=747 bgcolor=#d6d6d6
| 400747 ||  || — || October 17, 2009 || Catalina || CSS || — || align=right | 3.9 km || 
|-id=748 bgcolor=#d6d6d6
| 400748 ||  || — || October 25, 2009 || Kitt Peak || Spacewatch || LIX || align=right | 3.3 km || 
|-id=749 bgcolor=#d6d6d6
| 400749 ||  || — || November 8, 2009 || Kitt Peak || Spacewatch || — || align=right | 2.5 km || 
|-id=750 bgcolor=#d6d6d6
| 400750 ||  || — || November 8, 2009 || Kitt Peak || Spacewatch || 7:4 || align=right | 4.0 km || 
|-id=751 bgcolor=#d6d6d6
| 400751 ||  || — || November 10, 2009 || Catalina || CSS || — || align=right | 3.3 km || 
|-id=752 bgcolor=#d6d6d6
| 400752 ||  || — || September 28, 2009 || Kitt Peak || Spacewatch || VER || align=right | 2.1 km || 
|-id=753 bgcolor=#d6d6d6
| 400753 ||  || — || November 27, 2009 || Mount Lemmon || Mount Lemmon Survey || EUP || align=right | 4.6 km || 
|-id=754 bgcolor=#fefefe
| 400754 ||  || — || November 19, 2009 || Mount Lemmon || Mount Lemmon Survey || ERI || align=right | 1.6 km || 
|-id=755 bgcolor=#fefefe
| 400755 ||  || — || December 19, 2009 || Mount Lemmon || Mount Lemmon Survey || — || align=right data-sort-value="0.77" | 770 m || 
|-id=756 bgcolor=#d6d6d6
| 400756 ||  || — || September 25, 2009 || Catalina || CSS || (1118) || align=right | 7.1 km || 
|-id=757 bgcolor=#d6d6d6
| 400757 ||  || — || January 27, 2010 || WISE || WISE || — || align=right | 3.3 km || 
|-id=758 bgcolor=#fefefe
| 400758 ||  || — || February 8, 2010 || Kitt Peak || Spacewatch || NYS || align=right data-sort-value="0.61" | 610 m || 
|-id=759 bgcolor=#fefefe
| 400759 ||  || — || February 13, 2010 || Mount Lemmon || Mount Lemmon Survey || — || align=right data-sort-value="0.90" | 900 m || 
|-id=760 bgcolor=#fefefe
| 400760 ||  || — || January 8, 2010 || Kitt Peak || Spacewatch || — || align=right data-sort-value="0.82" | 820 m || 
|-id=761 bgcolor=#fefefe
| 400761 ||  || — || February 13, 2010 || Kitt Peak || Spacewatch || NYS || align=right data-sort-value="0.59" | 590 m || 
|-id=762 bgcolor=#fefefe
| 400762 ||  || — || February 14, 2010 || Mount Lemmon || Mount Lemmon Survey || — || align=right | 1.0 km || 
|-id=763 bgcolor=#fefefe
| 400763 ||  || — || February 14, 2010 || Kitt Peak || Spacewatch || — || align=right data-sort-value="0.78" | 780 m || 
|-id=764 bgcolor=#fefefe
| 400764 ||  || — || March 12, 2003 || Kitt Peak || Spacewatch || NYS || align=right | 1.0 km || 
|-id=765 bgcolor=#fefefe
| 400765 ||  || — || February 14, 2010 || Mount Lemmon || Mount Lemmon Survey || — || align=right data-sort-value="0.64" | 640 m || 
|-id=766 bgcolor=#d6d6d6
| 400766 ||  || — || February 15, 2010 || Kitt Peak || Spacewatch || — || align=right | 3.9 km || 
|-id=767 bgcolor=#fefefe
| 400767 ||  || — || February 13, 2010 || Mount Lemmon || Mount Lemmon Survey || — || align=right data-sort-value="0.73" | 730 m || 
|-id=768 bgcolor=#fefefe
| 400768 ||  || — || February 14, 2010 || Kitt Peak || Spacewatch || — || align=right data-sort-value="0.68" | 680 m || 
|-id=769 bgcolor=#fefefe
| 400769 ||  || — || February 16, 2010 || Kitt Peak || Spacewatch || NYS || align=right data-sort-value="0.47" | 470 m || 
|-id=770 bgcolor=#fefefe
| 400770 ||  || — || February 16, 2010 || Kitt Peak || Spacewatch || — || align=right data-sort-value="0.73" | 730 m || 
|-id=771 bgcolor=#E9E9E9
| 400771 ||  || — || February 17, 2010 || WISE || WISE || — || align=right | 2.4 km || 
|-id=772 bgcolor=#fefefe
| 400772 ||  || — || February 16, 2010 || Kitt Peak || Spacewatch || H || align=right data-sort-value="0.94" | 940 m || 
|-id=773 bgcolor=#E9E9E9
| 400773 ||  || — || February 21, 2010 || WISE || WISE || — || align=right | 2.2 km || 
|-id=774 bgcolor=#E9E9E9
| 400774 ||  || — || March 5, 2010 || WISE || WISE || — || align=right | 2.6 km || 
|-id=775 bgcolor=#fefefe
| 400775 ||  || — || March 9, 2010 || Taunus || E. Schwab, R. Kling || NYS || align=right data-sort-value="0.63" | 630 m || 
|-id=776 bgcolor=#fefefe
| 400776 ||  || — || March 4, 2010 || Kitt Peak || Spacewatch || — || align=right data-sort-value="0.78" | 780 m || 
|-id=777 bgcolor=#fefefe
| 400777 ||  || — || March 4, 2010 || Kitt Peak || Spacewatch || — || align=right data-sort-value="0.75" | 750 m || 
|-id=778 bgcolor=#fefefe
| 400778 ||  || — || April 5, 2000 || Socorro || LINEAR || — || align=right data-sort-value="0.81" | 810 m || 
|-id=779 bgcolor=#fefefe
| 400779 ||  || — || March 12, 2010 || Kitt Peak || Spacewatch || — || align=right | 1.8 km || 
|-id=780 bgcolor=#fefefe
| 400780 ||  || — || March 13, 2010 || Mount Lemmon || Mount Lemmon Survey || V || align=right data-sort-value="0.78" | 780 m || 
|-id=781 bgcolor=#fefefe
| 400781 ||  || — || March 13, 2010 || Kitt Peak || Spacewatch || — || align=right | 1.4 km || 
|-id=782 bgcolor=#fefefe
| 400782 ||  || — || March 14, 2010 || Kitt Peak || Spacewatch || — || align=right | 1.1 km || 
|-id=783 bgcolor=#fefefe
| 400783 ||  || — || March 14, 2010 || Kitt Peak || Spacewatch || NYS || align=right data-sort-value="0.85" | 850 m || 
|-id=784 bgcolor=#fefefe
| 400784 ||  || — || March 12, 2010 || Catalina || CSS || — || align=right data-sort-value="0.93" | 930 m || 
|-id=785 bgcolor=#fefefe
| 400785 ||  || — || March 12, 2010 || Kitt Peak || Spacewatch || — || align=right data-sort-value="0.81" | 810 m || 
|-id=786 bgcolor=#fefefe
| 400786 ||  || — || January 5, 2006 || Mount Lemmon || Mount Lemmon Survey || — || align=right data-sort-value="0.81" | 810 m || 
|-id=787 bgcolor=#fefefe
| 400787 ||  || — || March 5, 2010 || Kitt Peak || Spacewatch || NYS || align=right data-sort-value="0.72" | 720 m || 
|-id=788 bgcolor=#fefefe
| 400788 ||  || — || August 10, 2007 || Kitt Peak || Spacewatch || — || align=right data-sort-value="0.76" | 760 m || 
|-id=789 bgcolor=#fefefe
| 400789 ||  || — || March 13, 2010 || Kitt Peak || Spacewatch || V || align=right data-sort-value="0.62" | 620 m || 
|-id=790 bgcolor=#fefefe
| 400790 ||  || — || March 13, 2010 || Kitt Peak || Spacewatch || — || align=right data-sort-value="0.70" | 700 m || 
|-id=791 bgcolor=#fefefe
| 400791 ||  || — || March 12, 2010 || Kitt Peak || Spacewatch || NYS || align=right data-sort-value="0.52" | 520 m || 
|-id=792 bgcolor=#fefefe
| 400792 ||  || — || March 15, 2010 || Mount Lemmon || Mount Lemmon Survey || — || align=right data-sort-value="0.79" | 790 m || 
|-id=793 bgcolor=#fefefe
| 400793 ||  || — || September 26, 2008 || Kitt Peak || Spacewatch || — || align=right data-sort-value="0.65" | 650 m || 
|-id=794 bgcolor=#fefefe
| 400794 ||  || — || December 26, 2005 || Kitt Peak || Spacewatch || — || align=right data-sort-value="0.78" | 780 m || 
|-id=795 bgcolor=#fefefe
| 400795 ||  || — || March 20, 2010 || Kitt Peak || Spacewatch || — || align=right data-sort-value="0.86" | 860 m || 
|-id=796 bgcolor=#E9E9E9
| 400796 Douglass ||  ||  || March 31, 2010 || WISE || WISE || — || align=right | 3.2 km || 
|-id=797 bgcolor=#fefefe
| 400797 ||  || — || March 21, 2010 || Kitt Peak || Spacewatch || NYS || align=right data-sort-value="0.69" | 690 m || 
|-id=798 bgcolor=#fefefe
| 400798 ||  || — || February 14, 2010 || Catalina || CSS || — || align=right | 1.5 km || 
|-id=799 bgcolor=#fefefe
| 400799 ||  || — || April 3, 2010 || WISE || WISE || — || align=right | 2.8 km || 
|-id=800 bgcolor=#fefefe
| 400800 ||  || — || April 7, 2010 || La Sagra || OAM Obs. || — || align=right data-sort-value="0.97" | 970 m || 
|}

400801–400900 

|-bgcolor=#fefefe
| 400801 ||  || — || April 7, 2010 || Catalina || CSS || — || align=right data-sort-value="0.92" | 920 m || 
|-id=802 bgcolor=#fefefe
| 400802 ||  || — || April 7, 2010 || Kitt Peak || Spacewatch || — || align=right data-sort-value="0.73" | 730 m || 
|-id=803 bgcolor=#fefefe
| 400803 ||  || — || April 10, 2010 || Kitt Peak || Spacewatch || — || align=right data-sort-value="0.67" | 670 m || 
|-id=804 bgcolor=#fefefe
| 400804 ||  || — || February 2, 2006 || Mount Lemmon || Mount Lemmon Survey || — || align=right data-sort-value="0.75" | 750 m || 
|-id=805 bgcolor=#fefefe
| 400805 ||  || — || April 9, 2010 || Kitt Peak || Spacewatch || — || align=right | 1.5 km || 
|-id=806 bgcolor=#fefefe
| 400806 ||  || — || April 10, 2010 || Mount Lemmon || Mount Lemmon Survey || — || align=right data-sort-value="0.70" | 700 m || 
|-id=807 bgcolor=#fefefe
| 400807 ||  || — || April 9, 2003 || Kitt Peak || Spacewatch || — || align=right data-sort-value="0.85" | 850 m || 
|-id=808 bgcolor=#fefefe
| 400808 ||  || — || May 4, 2006 || Mount Lemmon || Mount Lemmon Survey || — || align=right | 1.0 km || 
|-id=809 bgcolor=#fefefe
| 400809 ||  || — || April 10, 2010 || Mount Lemmon || Mount Lemmon Survey || — || align=right | 2.3 km || 
|-id=810 bgcolor=#fefefe
| 400810 ||  || — || April 10, 2010 || Mount Lemmon || Mount Lemmon Survey || — || align=right | 2.0 km || 
|-id=811 bgcolor=#fefefe
| 400811 Gillesfontaine ||  ||  || April 15, 2010 || WISE || WISE || — || align=right | 2.1 km || 
|-id=812 bgcolor=#fefefe
| 400812 ||  || — || November 7, 2008 || Mount Lemmon || Mount Lemmon Survey || — || align=right | 1.3 km || 
|-id=813 bgcolor=#fefefe
| 400813 ||  || — || February 27, 2006 || Kitt Peak || Spacewatch || — || align=right data-sort-value="0.70" | 700 m || 
|-id=814 bgcolor=#fefefe
| 400814 ||  || — || April 20, 2010 || Kitt Peak || Spacewatch || — || align=right data-sort-value="0.75" | 750 m || 
|-id=815 bgcolor=#fefefe
| 400815 ||  || — || April 20, 2010 || Kitt Peak || Spacewatch || — || align=right data-sort-value="0.71" | 710 m || 
|-id=816 bgcolor=#E9E9E9
| 400816 ||  || — || April 30, 2010 || WISE || WISE || — || align=right | 2.0 km || 
|-id=817 bgcolor=#fefefe
| 400817 ||  || — || March 6, 2006 || Mount Lemmon || Mount Lemmon Survey || MAS || align=right data-sort-value="0.71" | 710 m || 
|-id=818 bgcolor=#fefefe
| 400818 ||  || — || May 3, 2010 || Kitt Peak || Spacewatch || — || align=right data-sort-value="0.95" | 950 m || 
|-id=819 bgcolor=#fefefe
| 400819 ||  || — || April 9, 2010 || Kitt Peak || Spacewatch || — || align=right data-sort-value="0.80" | 800 m || 
|-id=820 bgcolor=#E9E9E9
| 400820 ||  || — || April 7, 2010 || Kitt Peak || Spacewatch || — || align=right | 1.8 km || 
|-id=821 bgcolor=#fefefe
| 400821 ||  || — || February 4, 1995 || Kitt Peak || Spacewatch || MAS || align=right data-sort-value="0.76" | 760 m || 
|-id=822 bgcolor=#fefefe
| 400822 ||  || — || May 7, 2010 || Mount Lemmon || Mount Lemmon Survey || — || align=right | 1.7 km || 
|-id=823 bgcolor=#fefefe
| 400823 ||  || — || March 24, 2006 || Kitt Peak || Spacewatch || — || align=right data-sort-value="0.88" | 880 m || 
|-id=824 bgcolor=#E9E9E9
| 400824 ||  || — || May 12, 2010 || WISE || WISE || — || align=right | 1.8 km || 
|-id=825 bgcolor=#fefefe
| 400825 ||  || — || February 10, 2010 || WISE || WISE || — || align=right | 1.8 km || 
|-id=826 bgcolor=#fefefe
| 400826 ||  || — || May 12, 2010 || Mount Lemmon || Mount Lemmon Survey || — || align=right | 1.3 km || 
|-id=827 bgcolor=#fefefe
| 400827 ||  || — || March 31, 2003 || Kitt Peak || Spacewatch || V || align=right data-sort-value="0.67" | 670 m || 
|-id=828 bgcolor=#fefefe
| 400828 ||  || — || May 11, 2010 || Mount Lemmon || Mount Lemmon Survey || — || align=right data-sort-value="0.94" | 940 m || 
|-id=829 bgcolor=#E9E9E9
| 400829 ||  || — || May 19, 2010 || WISE || WISE || — || align=right | 2.3 km || 
|-id=830 bgcolor=#fefefe
| 400830 ||  || — || September 9, 2007 || Kitt Peak || Spacewatch || — || align=right data-sort-value="0.87" | 870 m || 
|-id=831 bgcolor=#d6d6d6
| 400831 ||  || — || May 26, 2010 || WISE || WISE || NAE || align=right | 4.2 km || 
|-id=832 bgcolor=#E9E9E9
| 400832 ||  || — || May 25, 2010 || WISE || WISE || — || align=right | 2.9 km || 
|-id=833 bgcolor=#E9E9E9
| 400833 ||  || — || May 29, 2010 || WISE || WISE || JUN || align=right | 1.2 km || 
|-id=834 bgcolor=#fefefe
| 400834 ||  || — || May 19, 2010 || Catalina || CSS || (5026) || align=right | 2.0 km || 
|-id=835 bgcolor=#E9E9E9
| 400835 ||  || — || May 31, 2010 || WISE || WISE || — || align=right | 1.6 km || 
|-id=836 bgcolor=#d6d6d6
| 400836 ||  || — || June 6, 2010 || WISE || WISE || — || align=right | 2.5 km || 
|-id=837 bgcolor=#E9E9E9
| 400837 ||  || — || June 7, 2010 || WISE || WISE || — || align=right | 1.7 km || 
|-id=838 bgcolor=#E9E9E9
| 400838 ||  || — || June 8, 2010 || WISE || WISE || — || align=right | 1.3 km || 
|-id=839 bgcolor=#E9E9E9
| 400839 ||  || — || June 9, 2010 || WISE || WISE || — || align=right | 3.1 km || 
|-id=840 bgcolor=#fefefe
| 400840 ||  || — || May 7, 2010 || Mount Lemmon || Mount Lemmon Survey || — || align=right | 1.0 km || 
|-id=841 bgcolor=#E9E9E9
| 400841 ||  || — || June 10, 2010 || WISE || WISE || — || align=right | 2.4 km || 
|-id=842 bgcolor=#E9E9E9
| 400842 ||  || — || June 11, 2010 || WISE || WISE || — || align=right | 2.8 km || 
|-id=843 bgcolor=#E9E9E9
| 400843 ||  || — || June 13, 2010 || WISE || WISE || JUN || align=right | 1.4 km || 
|-id=844 bgcolor=#fefefe
| 400844 ||  || — || February 27, 2006 || Kitt Peak || Spacewatch || — || align=right data-sort-value="0.82" | 820 m || 
|-id=845 bgcolor=#E9E9E9
| 400845 ||  || — || June 15, 2010 || WISE || WISE || — || align=right | 2.7 km || 
|-id=846 bgcolor=#E9E9E9
| 400846 ||  || — || December 31, 2002 || Socorro || LINEAR || BAR || align=right | 1.7 km || 
|-id=847 bgcolor=#E9E9E9
| 400847 ||  || — || June 17, 2010 || WISE || WISE || — || align=right | 1.2 km || 
|-id=848 bgcolor=#E9E9E9
| 400848 ||  || — || June 18, 2010 || WISE || WISE || — || align=right | 1.7 km || 
|-id=849 bgcolor=#E9E9E9
| 400849 ||  || — || June 18, 2010 || WISE || WISE || — || align=right | 2.3 km || 
|-id=850 bgcolor=#E9E9E9
| 400850 ||  || — || October 2, 2006 || Mount Lemmon || Mount Lemmon Survey || — || align=right | 2.5 km || 
|-id=851 bgcolor=#E9E9E9
| 400851 ||  || — || October 22, 2006 || Kitt Peak || Spacewatch || — || align=right | 2.0 km || 
|-id=852 bgcolor=#E9E9E9
| 400852 ||  || — || June 21, 2010 || WISE || WISE || EUN || align=right | 1.7 km || 
|-id=853 bgcolor=#d6d6d6
| 400853 ||  || — || June 29, 2010 || WISE || WISE || — || align=right | 5.1 km || 
|-id=854 bgcolor=#E9E9E9
| 400854 ||  || — || March 9, 2008 || Mount Lemmon || Mount Lemmon Survey || — || align=right | 2.5 km || 
|-id=855 bgcolor=#fefefe
| 400855 ||  || — || June 21, 2010 || Mount Lemmon || Mount Lemmon Survey || NYS || align=right data-sort-value="0.95" | 950 m || 
|-id=856 bgcolor=#E9E9E9
| 400856 ||  || — || July 1, 2010 || WISE || WISE || — || align=right | 1.6 km || 
|-id=857 bgcolor=#E9E9E9
| 400857 ||  || — || July 8, 2010 || WISE || WISE || — || align=right | 2.2 km || 
|-id=858 bgcolor=#E9E9E9
| 400858 ||  || — || February 28, 2008 || Mount Lemmon || Mount Lemmon Survey || — || align=right | 2.5 km || 
|-id=859 bgcolor=#E9E9E9
| 400859 ||  || — || November 21, 2001 || Socorro || LINEAR || HOF || align=right | 2.6 km || 
|-id=860 bgcolor=#E9E9E9
| 400860 ||  || — || July 10, 2010 || WISE || WISE || — || align=right | 2.3 km || 
|-id=861 bgcolor=#E9E9E9
| 400861 ||  || — || July 11, 2010 || WISE || WISE || — || align=right | 2.5 km || 
|-id=862 bgcolor=#E9E9E9
| 400862 ||  || — || July 6, 2010 || Kitt Peak || Spacewatch || critical || align=right data-sort-value="0.75" | 750 m || 
|-id=863 bgcolor=#E9E9E9
| 400863 ||  || — || November 4, 2007 || Mount Lemmon || Mount Lemmon Survey || — || align=right | 1.7 km || 
|-id=864 bgcolor=#d6d6d6
| 400864 ||  || — || October 25, 2005 || Kitt Peak || Spacewatch || — || align=right | 2.9 km || 
|-id=865 bgcolor=#E9E9E9
| 400865 ||  || — || March 31, 2009 || Kitt Peak || Spacewatch || ADE || align=right | 2.3 km || 
|-id=866 bgcolor=#d6d6d6
| 400866 ||  || — || July 18, 2010 || WISE || WISE || — || align=right | 3.6 km || 
|-id=867 bgcolor=#E9E9E9
| 400867 ||  || — || September 14, 2005 || Kitt Peak || Spacewatch || HOF || align=right | 2.9 km || 
|-id=868 bgcolor=#d6d6d6
| 400868 ||  || — || July 20, 2010 || WISE || WISE || — || align=right | 4.1 km || 
|-id=869 bgcolor=#E9E9E9
| 400869 ||  || — || July 21, 2010 || WISE || WISE || — || align=right | 2.6 km || 
|-id=870 bgcolor=#E9E9E9
| 400870 ||  || — || April 18, 2009 || Mount Lemmon || Mount Lemmon Survey || — || align=right | 1.1 km || 
|-id=871 bgcolor=#d6d6d6
| 400871 ||  || — || July 22, 2010 || WISE || WISE || — || align=right | 2.0 km || 
|-id=872 bgcolor=#E9E9E9
| 400872 ||  || — || July 7, 1997 || Kitt Peak || Spacewatch || — || align=right | 1.5 km || 
|-id=873 bgcolor=#d6d6d6
| 400873 ||  || — || August 8, 2004 || Socorro || LINEAR || — || align=right | 3.7 km || 
|-id=874 bgcolor=#d6d6d6
| 400874 ||  || — || July 27, 2010 || WISE || WISE || — || align=right | 2.7 km || 
|-id=875 bgcolor=#d6d6d6
| 400875 ||  || — || July 28, 2010 || WISE || WISE || — || align=right | 2.3 km || 
|-id=876 bgcolor=#d6d6d6
| 400876 ||  || — || July 29, 2010 || WISE || WISE || — || align=right | 2.5 km || 
|-id=877 bgcolor=#d6d6d6
| 400877 ||  || — || July 31, 2010 || WISE || WISE || — || align=right | 4.4 km || 
|-id=878 bgcolor=#E9E9E9
| 400878 ||  || — || August 4, 2010 || Socorro || LINEAR || — || align=right | 2.8 km || 
|-id=879 bgcolor=#d6d6d6
| 400879 ||  || — || November 22, 2005 || Kitt Peak || Spacewatch || — || align=right | 5.2 km || 
|-id=880 bgcolor=#E9E9E9
| 400880 ||  || — || August 8, 2010 || WISE || WISE || — || align=right | 2.3 km || 
|-id=881 bgcolor=#E9E9E9
| 400881 Vladimírdolinay ||  ||  || August 7, 2010 || Charleston || T. Vorobjov || — || align=right | 2.5 km || 
|-id=882 bgcolor=#E9E9E9
| 400882 ||  || — || August 14, 2010 || Kitt Peak || Spacewatch || — || align=right | 1.3 km || 
|-id=883 bgcolor=#E9E9E9
| 400883 ||  || — || August 11, 2010 || La Sagra || OAM Obs. || (5) || align=right data-sort-value="0.93" | 930 m || 
|-id=884 bgcolor=#d6d6d6
| 400884 ||  || — || April 7, 2008 || Kitt Peak || Spacewatch || EOS || align=right | 1.9 km || 
|-id=885 bgcolor=#E9E9E9
| 400885 ||  || — || August 30, 2010 || La Sagra || OAM Obs. || — || align=right | 1.8 km || 
|-id=886 bgcolor=#E9E9E9
| 400886 ||  || — || February 29, 2004 || Kitt Peak || Spacewatch || — || align=right | 2.5 km || 
|-id=887 bgcolor=#E9E9E9
| 400887 ||  || — || October 19, 2006 || Mount Lemmon || Mount Lemmon Survey || — || align=right | 1.8 km || 
|-id=888 bgcolor=#E9E9E9
| 400888 ||  || — || September 3, 2010 || Mount Lemmon || Mount Lemmon Survey || — || align=right | 1.5 km || 
|-id=889 bgcolor=#E9E9E9
| 400889 ||  || — || September 2, 2010 || Socorro || LINEAR || (1547) || align=right | 2.0 km || 
|-id=890 bgcolor=#E9E9E9
| 400890 ||  || — || September 3, 2010 || Socorro || LINEAR || — || align=right | 1.4 km || 
|-id=891 bgcolor=#E9E9E9
| 400891 ||  || — || May 8, 2005 || Kitt Peak || Spacewatch || — || align=right | 1.4 km || 
|-id=892 bgcolor=#d6d6d6
| 400892 ||  || — || March 26, 2008 || Mount Lemmon || Mount Lemmon Survey || EOS || align=right | 1.7 km || 
|-id=893 bgcolor=#E9E9E9
| 400893 ||  || — || September 5, 2010 || La Sagra || OAM Obs. || WIT || align=right | 1.1 km || 
|-id=894 bgcolor=#E9E9E9
| 400894 ||  || — || September 30, 2006 || Mount Lemmon || Mount Lemmon Survey || — || align=right | 1.5 km || 
|-id=895 bgcolor=#E9E9E9
| 400895 ||  || — || July 8, 2010 || WISE || WISE || HOF || align=right | 2.7 km || 
|-id=896 bgcolor=#d6d6d6
| 400896 ||  || — || August 22, 2004 || Kitt Peak || Spacewatch || EOS || align=right | 2.0 km || 
|-id=897 bgcolor=#E9E9E9
| 400897 ||  || — || February 13, 2008 || Kitt Peak || Spacewatch || — || align=right | 2.4 km || 
|-id=898 bgcolor=#d6d6d6
| 400898 ||  || — || April 6, 2008 || Kitt Peak || Spacewatch || — || align=right | 2.8 km || 
|-id=899 bgcolor=#E9E9E9
| 400899 ||  || — || April 22, 2009 || Mount Lemmon || Mount Lemmon Survey || — || align=right | 2.0 km || 
|-id=900 bgcolor=#d6d6d6
| 400900 ||  || — || October 9, 2005 || Kitt Peak || Spacewatch || — || align=right | 2.2 km || 
|}

400901–401000 

|-bgcolor=#d6d6d6
| 400901 ||  || — || February 22, 2007 || Kitt Peak || Spacewatch || — || align=right | 3.0 km || 
|-id=902 bgcolor=#d6d6d6
| 400902 ||  || — || September 26, 2005 || Kitt Peak || Spacewatch || — || align=right | 2.3 km || 
|-id=903 bgcolor=#E9E9E9
| 400903 ||  || — || September 9, 2010 || Kitt Peak || Spacewatch || — || align=right | 2.7 km || 
|-id=904 bgcolor=#E9E9E9
| 400904 ||  || — || September 10, 2010 || Kitt Peak || Spacewatch || — || align=right | 1.8 km || 
|-id=905 bgcolor=#d6d6d6
| 400905 ||  || — || February 9, 2007 || Mount Lemmon || Mount Lemmon Survey || — || align=right | 2.7 km || 
|-id=906 bgcolor=#d6d6d6
| 400906 ||  || — || October 29, 2005 || Catalina || CSS || — || align=right | 2.9 km || 
|-id=907 bgcolor=#E9E9E9
| 400907 ||  || — || September 11, 2001 || Socorro || LINEAR || — || align=right | 2.7 km || 
|-id=908 bgcolor=#d6d6d6
| 400908 ||  || — || February 10, 2008 || Kitt Peak || Spacewatch || — || align=right | 2.7 km || 
|-id=909 bgcolor=#E9E9E9
| 400909 ||  || — || April 6, 2008 || Kitt Peak || Spacewatch || — || align=right | 2.8 km || 
|-id=910 bgcolor=#E9E9E9
| 400910 ||  || — || February 13, 2004 || Kitt Peak || Spacewatch || — || align=right | 1.5 km || 
|-id=911 bgcolor=#d6d6d6
| 400911 ||  || — || October 2, 2010 || Kitt Peak || Spacewatch || — || align=right | 2.5 km || 
|-id=912 bgcolor=#d6d6d6
| 400912 ||  || — || August 27, 2005 || Kitt Peak || Spacewatch || KOR || align=right | 1.5 km || 
|-id=913 bgcolor=#d6d6d6
| 400913 ||  || — || August 30, 2005 || Kitt Peak || Spacewatch || KOR || align=right | 1.4 km || 
|-id=914 bgcolor=#E9E9E9
| 400914 ||  || — || September 4, 2010 || Kitt Peak || Spacewatch || — || align=right | 2.4 km || 
|-id=915 bgcolor=#E9E9E9
| 400915 ||  || — || October 9, 2010 || Catalina || CSS || — || align=right | 2.5 km || 
|-id=916 bgcolor=#E9E9E9
| 400916 ||  || — || November 16, 2006 || Kitt Peak || Spacewatch || — || align=right | 1.4 km || 
|-id=917 bgcolor=#d6d6d6
| 400917 ||  || — || March 28, 2008 || Kitt Peak || Spacewatch || EOS || align=right | 2.6 km || 
|-id=918 bgcolor=#d6d6d6
| 400918 ||  || — || October 12, 2010 || Kitt Peak || Spacewatch || — || align=right | 2.7 km || 
|-id=919 bgcolor=#d6d6d6
| 400919 ||  || — || April 28, 2008 || Mount Lemmon || Mount Lemmon Survey || — || align=right | 3.1 km || 
|-id=920 bgcolor=#d6d6d6
| 400920 ||  || — || November 30, 2005 || Kitt Peak || Spacewatch || — || align=right | 3.0 km || 
|-id=921 bgcolor=#E9E9E9
| 400921 ||  || — || June 6, 2005 || Kitt Peak || Spacewatch || — || align=right | 1.9 km || 
|-id=922 bgcolor=#E9E9E9
| 400922 ||  || — || April 17, 2009 || Kitt Peak || Spacewatch || — || align=right | 1.7 km || 
|-id=923 bgcolor=#d6d6d6
| 400923 ||  || — || August 8, 2004 || Socorro || LINEAR || — || align=right | 3.4 km || 
|-id=924 bgcolor=#E9E9E9
| 400924 ||  || — || December 14, 2001 || Socorro || LINEAR || — || align=right | 2.3 km || 
|-id=925 bgcolor=#d6d6d6
| 400925 ||  || — || September 14, 2004 || Anderson Mesa || LONEOS || — || align=right | 2.9 km || 
|-id=926 bgcolor=#d6d6d6
| 400926 ||  || — || October 28, 2010 || Kitt Peak || Spacewatch || — || align=right | 3.2 km || 
|-id=927 bgcolor=#d6d6d6
| 400927 ||  || — || September 5, 2010 || Mount Lemmon || Mount Lemmon Survey || — || align=right | 3.9 km || 
|-id=928 bgcolor=#d6d6d6
| 400928 ||  || — || October 19, 2010 || Mount Lemmon || Mount Lemmon Survey || — || align=right | 2.3 km || 
|-id=929 bgcolor=#E9E9E9
| 400929 ||  || — || November 11, 1996 || Kitt Peak || Spacewatch || — || align=right | 2.4 km || 
|-id=930 bgcolor=#d6d6d6
| 400930 ||  || — || October 29, 2010 || Kitt Peak || Spacewatch || — || align=right | 4.1 km || 
|-id=931 bgcolor=#d6d6d6
| 400931 ||  || — || October 29, 2010 || Kitt Peak || Spacewatch || — || align=right | 2.9 km || 
|-id=932 bgcolor=#d6d6d6
| 400932 ||  || — || September 3, 2010 || Mount Lemmon || Mount Lemmon Survey || — || align=right | 4.4 km || 
|-id=933 bgcolor=#d6d6d6
| 400933 ||  || — || September 23, 2004 || Kitt Peak || Spacewatch || — || align=right | 2.9 km || 
|-id=934 bgcolor=#E9E9E9
| 400934 ||  || — || June 26, 2010 || WISE || WISE || — || align=right | 4.6 km || 
|-id=935 bgcolor=#d6d6d6
| 400935 ||  || — || October 8, 1999 || Socorro || LINEAR || — || align=right | 3.5 km || 
|-id=936 bgcolor=#E9E9E9
| 400936 ||  || — || April 7, 2008 || Kitt Peak || Spacewatch || — || align=right | 2.5 km || 
|-id=937 bgcolor=#d6d6d6
| 400937 ||  || — || October 14, 2010 || Mount Lemmon || Mount Lemmon Survey || — || align=right | 3.9 km || 
|-id=938 bgcolor=#d6d6d6
| 400938 ||  || — || December 4, 2005 || Mount Lemmon || Mount Lemmon Survey || — || align=right | 2.8 km || 
|-id=939 bgcolor=#d6d6d6
| 400939 ||  || — || January 27, 2007 || Mount Lemmon || Mount Lemmon Survey || — || align=right | 2.8 km || 
|-id=940 bgcolor=#d6d6d6
| 400940 ||  || — || October 7, 1999 || Socorro || LINEAR || — || align=right | 3.2 km || 
|-id=941 bgcolor=#d6d6d6
| 400941 ||  || — || December 21, 2005 || Kitt Peak || Spacewatch || — || align=right | 2.1 km || 
|-id=942 bgcolor=#d6d6d6
| 400942 ||  || — || January 7, 2006 || Kitt Peak || Spacewatch || VER || align=right | 3.0 km || 
|-id=943 bgcolor=#d6d6d6
| 400943 ||  || — || October 13, 2010 || Mount Lemmon || Mount Lemmon Survey || — || align=right | 3.1 km || 
|-id=944 bgcolor=#d6d6d6
| 400944 ||  || — || November 6, 2010 || Mount Lemmon || Mount Lemmon Survey || — || align=right | 4.4 km || 
|-id=945 bgcolor=#d6d6d6
| 400945 ||  || — || November 6, 2005 || Mount Lemmon || Mount Lemmon Survey || — || align=right | 2.7 km || 
|-id=946 bgcolor=#E9E9E9
| 400946 ||  || — || August 29, 2005 || Kitt Peak || Spacewatch || — || align=right | 2.5 km || 
|-id=947 bgcolor=#d6d6d6
| 400947 ||  || — || December 4, 2005 || Kitt Peak || Spacewatch || — || align=right | 3.0 km || 
|-id=948 bgcolor=#d6d6d6
| 400948 ||  || — || October 30, 2010 || Kitt Peak || Spacewatch || EOS || align=right | 2.4 km || 
|-id=949 bgcolor=#d6d6d6
| 400949 ||  || — || July 29, 2009 || Kitt Peak || Spacewatch || — || align=right | 3.8 km || 
|-id=950 bgcolor=#d6d6d6
| 400950 ||  || — || October 13, 2010 || Mount Lemmon || Mount Lemmon Survey || EOS || align=right | 1.9 km || 
|-id=951 bgcolor=#d6d6d6
| 400951 ||  || — || October 30, 2010 || Kitt Peak || Spacewatch || TIR || align=right | 3.4 km || 
|-id=952 bgcolor=#d6d6d6
| 400952 ||  || — || January 27, 2007 || Mount Lemmon || Mount Lemmon Survey || KOR || align=right | 1.5 km || 
|-id=953 bgcolor=#d6d6d6
| 400953 ||  || — || April 30, 2008 || Mount Lemmon || Mount Lemmon Survey || TEL || align=right | 1.6 km || 
|-id=954 bgcolor=#d6d6d6
| 400954 ||  || — || August 12, 2010 || Kitt Peak || Spacewatch || — || align=right | 4.2 km || 
|-id=955 bgcolor=#d6d6d6
| 400955 ||  || — || September 20, 1998 || Kitt Peak || Spacewatch || HYG || align=right | 2.7 km || 
|-id=956 bgcolor=#d6d6d6
| 400956 ||  || — || February 17, 2007 || Kitt Peak || Spacewatch || — || align=right | 2.7 km || 
|-id=957 bgcolor=#d6d6d6
| 400957 ||  || — || January 10, 2007 || Mount Lemmon || Mount Lemmon Survey || KOR || align=right | 1.4 km || 
|-id=958 bgcolor=#d6d6d6
| 400958 ||  || — || April 29, 2008 || Mount Lemmon || Mount Lemmon Survey || EOS || align=right | 1.8 km || 
|-id=959 bgcolor=#E9E9E9
| 400959 ||  || — || September 11, 2010 || Mount Lemmon || Mount Lemmon Survey || — || align=right | 1.8 km || 
|-id=960 bgcolor=#d6d6d6
| 400960 ||  || — || December 30, 2005 || Kitt Peak || Spacewatch || — || align=right | 3.3 km || 
|-id=961 bgcolor=#d6d6d6
| 400961 ||  || — || August 9, 2004 || Socorro || LINEAR || — || align=right | 3.1 km || 
|-id=962 bgcolor=#E9E9E9
| 400962 ||  || — || July 27, 2010 || WISE || WISE || DOR || align=right | 2.7 km || 
|-id=963 bgcolor=#d6d6d6
| 400963 ||  || — || March 31, 2008 || Mount Lemmon || Mount Lemmon Survey || — || align=right | 2.4 km || 
|-id=964 bgcolor=#d6d6d6
| 400964 ||  || — || November 26, 2005 || Kitt Peak || Spacewatch || — || align=right | 2.5 km || 
|-id=965 bgcolor=#d6d6d6
| 400965 ||  || — || September 18, 2010 || Mount Lemmon || Mount Lemmon Survey || — || align=right | 3.6 km || 
|-id=966 bgcolor=#d6d6d6
| 400966 ||  || — || October 11, 2004 || Kitt Peak || Spacewatch || — || align=right | 2.9 km || 
|-id=967 bgcolor=#d6d6d6
| 400967 ||  || — || September 17, 2004 || Anderson Mesa || LONEOS || — || align=right | 2.9 km || 
|-id=968 bgcolor=#d6d6d6
| 400968 ||  || — || October 31, 2010 || Kitt Peak || Spacewatch || TIR || align=right | 3.3 km || 
|-id=969 bgcolor=#d6d6d6
| 400969 ||  || — || November 16, 2010 || Mount Lemmon || Mount Lemmon Survey || — || align=right | 2.8 km || 
|-id=970 bgcolor=#d6d6d6
| 400970 ||  || — || November 16, 2010 || Mount Lemmon || Mount Lemmon Survey || — || align=right | 2.5 km || 
|-id=971 bgcolor=#d6d6d6
| 400971 ||  || — || October 4, 2004 || Kitt Peak || Spacewatch || — || align=right | 2.4 km || 
|-id=972 bgcolor=#d6d6d6
| 400972 ||  || — || November 9, 2004 || Catalina || CSS || — || align=right | 3.5 km || 
|-id=973 bgcolor=#d6d6d6
| 400973 ||  || — || January 7, 1994 || Kitt Peak || Spacewatch || EUP || align=right | 4.7 km || 
|-id=974 bgcolor=#d6d6d6
| 400974 ||  || — || April 30, 2008 || Mount Lemmon || Mount Lemmon Survey || — || align=right | 2.4 km || 
|-id=975 bgcolor=#d6d6d6
| 400975 ||  || — || October 1, 2005 || Kitt Peak || Spacewatch || — || align=right | 3.6 km || 
|-id=976 bgcolor=#d6d6d6
| 400976 ||  || — || August 17, 2009 || Catalina || CSS || — || align=right | 3.4 km || 
|-id=977 bgcolor=#E9E9E9
| 400977 ||  || — || September 27, 2006 || Mount Lemmon || Mount Lemmon Survey || — || align=right | 2.4 km || 
|-id=978 bgcolor=#d6d6d6
| 400978 ||  || — || March 19, 2007 || Mount Lemmon || Mount Lemmon Survey || — || align=right | 3.6 km || 
|-id=979 bgcolor=#d6d6d6
| 400979 ||  || — || November 11, 2010 || Mount Lemmon || Mount Lemmon Survey || — || align=right | 2.3 km || 
|-id=980 bgcolor=#FA8072
| 400980 ||  || — || March 26, 2007 || Catalina || CSS || — || align=right data-sort-value="0.60" | 600 m || 
|-id=981 bgcolor=#d6d6d6
| 400981 ||  || — || November 11, 2004 || Kitt Peak || Spacewatch || — || align=right | 4.0 km || 
|-id=982 bgcolor=#d6d6d6
| 400982 ||  || — || November 13, 2010 || Kitt Peak || Spacewatch || — || align=right | 3.4 km || 
|-id=983 bgcolor=#d6d6d6
| 400983 ||  || — || January 5, 2000 || Kitt Peak || Spacewatch || — || align=right | 3.3 km || 
|-id=984 bgcolor=#d6d6d6
| 400984 ||  || — || July 29, 2009 || Kitt Peak || Spacewatch || — || align=right | 3.6 km || 
|-id=985 bgcolor=#d6d6d6
| 400985 ||  || — || October 1, 2005 || Mount Lemmon || Mount Lemmon Survey || — || align=right | 3.8 km || 
|-id=986 bgcolor=#d6d6d6
| 400986 ||  || — || December 10, 2004 || Catalina || CSS || EUP || align=right | 4.2 km || 
|-id=987 bgcolor=#d6d6d6
| 400987 ||  || — || January 30, 2006 || Kitt Peak || Spacewatch || EOS || align=right | 2.2 km || 
|-id=988 bgcolor=#d6d6d6
| 400988 ||  || — || December 8, 2010 || Mount Lemmon || Mount Lemmon Survey || — || align=right | 3.3 km || 
|-id=989 bgcolor=#d6d6d6
| 400989 ||  || — || December 29, 2003 || Kitt Peak || Spacewatch || SYL7:4 || align=right | 3.6 km || 
|-id=990 bgcolor=#d6d6d6
| 400990 ||  || — || December 15, 2004 || Socorro || LINEAR || — || align=right | 3.4 km || 
|-id=991 bgcolor=#d6d6d6
| 400991 ||  || — || December 7, 2004 || Socorro || LINEAR || — || align=right | 3.8 km || 
|-id=992 bgcolor=#fefefe
| 400992 ||  || — || January 28, 2006 || Mount Lemmon || Mount Lemmon Survey || H || align=right data-sort-value="0.79" | 790 m || 
|-id=993 bgcolor=#fefefe
| 400993 ||  || — || March 2, 2006 || Catalina || CSS || H || align=right data-sort-value="0.74" | 740 m || 
|-id=994 bgcolor=#fefefe
| 400994 ||  || — || January 13, 2008 || Mount Lemmon || Mount Lemmon Survey || H || align=right data-sort-value="0.64" | 640 m || 
|-id=995 bgcolor=#fefefe
| 400995 ||  || — || September 16, 2006 || Kitt Peak || Spacewatch || H || align=right data-sort-value="0.72" | 720 m || 
|-id=996 bgcolor=#fefefe
| 400996 ||  || — || June 27, 2011 || Kitt Peak || Spacewatch || — || align=right | 1.5 km || 
|-id=997 bgcolor=#fefefe
| 400997 ||  || — || October 31, 2008 || Kitt Peak || Spacewatch || V || align=right data-sort-value="0.47" | 470 m || 
|-id=998 bgcolor=#fefefe
| 400998 ||  || — || August 9, 2004 || Anderson Mesa || LONEOS || — || align=right | 1.0 km || 
|-id=999 bgcolor=#fefefe
| 400999 ||  || — || March 13, 2007 || Kitt Peak || Spacewatch || — || align=right data-sort-value="0.75" | 750 m || 
|-id=000 bgcolor=#FA8072
| 401000 ||  || — || September 8, 1977 || Palomar || PLS || — || align=right data-sort-value="0.62" | 620 m || 
|}

References

External links 
 Discovery Circumstances: Numbered Minor Planets (400001)–(405000) (IAU Minor Planet Center)

0400